The Nissan GT-R (Japanese: 日産・GT-R, Nissan GT-R), is a sports car and grand tourer produced by Nissan, unveiled in 2007. It is the successor to the Nissan Skyline GT-R, a high-performance variant of the Nissan Skyline. Although this model was the sixth-generation to bear the GT-R name, it is no longer part of the Nissan Skyline line-up. The GT-R is built on the PM platform, which is derived from the FM platform used in the Skyline and the Z models. The GT-R abbreviation stands for Gran Turismo–Racing.

In 2006, then-Nissan CEO Carlos Ghosn decided that the GT-R would be sold worldwide, unlike its predecessors which were only sold in a limited number of markets.

After more than six years of development, the production version of the GT-R was unveiled at the 2007 Tokyo Motor Show, along with the PM platform and featured the VR38DETT engine and other new technologies. The overall body is made out of steel, aluminium and other materials such as carbon-fiber. The GT-R has had several facelifts, updates and special editions throughout the years. The GT-R was praised and received various accolades by automotive publications for its performance and practicality at an affordable price. It is one of the fastest production cars in the market. As well as a sports car, it has also achieved success in various motorsports. , the GT-R is in its sixteenth year of production.

History 

Between 1969 and 1974, and again between 1989 and 2002, Nissan produced a high performance version of its Nissan Skyline coupe, called the Nissan Skyline GT-R. This car proved to be iconic for Nissan, achieving much fame and success on the road and in motorsports.

The GT-R is an entirely new model sharing little with the Nissan Skyline GT-R, except its signature four round tail lights. Like some later generations of the Skyline GT-R, the GT-R has the ATTESA E-TS all-wheel drive system with a twin-turbocharged 6-cylinder engine. But the HICAS four-wheel-steering system was removed and the former straight-6 RB26DETT engine was replaced with the new VR38DETT engine. Despite the GT-R's heritage, the chassis code for the all-new version is CBA-R35 and for later model years DBA-R35 and 4BA-R35, or R35 for short (where CBA, DBA and 4BA stands for the emissions standard prefix), carrying on the naming trend from previous Skyline GT-R generations.

The GT-R also retained its predecessor's nickname, Godzilla, originally given to it by the Australian motoring publication Wheels in 1989 for its R32 generation model.

Development 

In 1999, as a result of the Renault–Nissan Alliance, Carlos Ghosn was appointed as the new CEO of Nissan. Following his appointment, he told the designers and engineers of Nissan to create a new GT-R, as he determined that a new GT-R would grant success for Nissan. He wanted the GT-R to provide an overall high level of performance – no matter how much time and money it would cost. Also, it should outperform or match the benchmark sports car at the time, the Porsche 911 (997) Turbo, specifically at the Nürburgring. In response, designers and engineers estimated they would need four or five years to develop such a high-performance sports car, as it should be made on an innovative platform along with lot more other technologies. Nissan began development of the GT-R in a mindset of "A Supercar for Anyone, Anywhere, Anytime". In 2001, Ghosn announced the development of the GT-R when a concept was revealed at the 2001 Tokyo Motor Show. At the 2003 Tokyo Motor Show, he announced that the production version would make its debut in the fall of 2007.

For the design perspective, Ghosn wanted four round taillights to be fitted to the new GT-R, just like in its predecessors; he claimed it always been the signature of the GT-R. Overall development began in the year 2000, with Nissan designers from Japan, United States and Europe began to create new sketches for the GT-R. 50 of them made through to Nissan's design director Shiro Nakamura. He claimed the new GT-R's design should reflect not only the modern sports car look, but also the Japanese culture and its predecessor's heritage. Chief designer Hiroshi Hasegawa required more than four years to complete the new GT-R's interior and exterior designs. He claimed it should look sporty, modern and also be aerodynamic to create enough downforce.

Nissan handed over the mechanical and technical development of the GT-R to the chief engineer of the Skyline GT-R R34, Kazutoshi Mizuno (also known as Mr. GT-R). But Mizuno rejected it at first, because he was told to make it on the Nissan FM platform. He said, "I couldn't make a world class performance car from this platform as Ghosn requested". In April 2003, Mizuno created a GT-R prototype which was made on an advanced version of the Nissan FM platform, named as Nissan Premium Midship (PM) platform. In November 2003, Ghosn handed over full authority of the development to Mizuno. In January 2004, Mizuno began development of the GT-R with a special development team and a full-scale GT-R model; the project was under the overall control of Ghosn.

At the time, while aerodynamics development was ongoing at Nissan's wind tunnel, Mizuno bought some GT-R test mules to racetracks, such as to the Nürburgring and Sendai Hi-Land Raceway, which aid development of the drivetrain, suspension and brakes. Those test mules were powdered by a brand new 3.8 L twin turbocharged V6 (VR38DETT) engine, developed by Nissan's chief powertrain engineer, Naoki Nakada. Also, some of the technical parts of the GT-R, such as the Brembo brakes system and Bilstein suspension setup were originally designed by Mizuno himself. Technical development was finalized along with the aerodynamics development, and testing began in several countries with different road and weather conditions.

Aerodynamics development of the GT-R began in early 2004 with a group of the company's best engineers − including the developer of the Nissan's successful Le Mans prototypes, Yoshi Suzuka. Development began with an internal design competition between Nissan's design studios at Atsugi, Tokyo, London and La Jolla. Nissan received more than 80 sketches from the respective design studios and 12 of them were chosen by Nissan with the help of design director, Nakamura. Those 12 sketches were whittled down to 3 models and tested in a wind tunnel by GT-R's exterior designers. Nissan wanted an aerodynamic level for the GT-R, which can aid stability for the car, create enough downforce while maintaining low drag to improve fuel efficiency and acceleration. Engineers considered it would be easier to achieve by using active aerodynamics. Later, the idea was rejected, because it would enlarge the price of the car, more than Nissan planned to offer.

In August 2004, Suzuka and Ken Nambo began wind tunnel testing at Nissan Technical Center in Atsugi, Japan. In 3 months, they tested three  scale models approximately more than 300 times and got positive results from their further development. They then decided to replace them by two 40% scale models, one for the development of the GT-R and another one for the Infiniti G35 test mule, which was built for testing at the Nürburgring. Later, the car's exterior designers, Hirohisa Ono and Masato Taguchi, joined to aid further development. The joint team tweaked some exterior parts of the GT-R, such as the front nose height. Even though engineers could not improve the overall aerodynamics as much as they expected.

Suzuka then considered to improve the internal airflow of the car, which required changing the design of the chassis frame. He requested the chassis department to lower the frame rails as low as the passenger compartment, which could eliminate transition and smoothen the airflow under the car. The team later used a CFD program for wind tunnel testing, which helped to upgrade several parts of the car that could smoothen the airflow and reduce drag. After one and a half years of development and more than 2000 wind tunnel test runs, engineers were finally able to get a stylish exterior with a drag coefficient of  combined with front and rear downforce.

Engineers and designers required more than five years to complete overall development of the GT-R. Following its development finalization in 2006, testing took another year to be finalized. Afterwards, Nissan announced the production version of the GT-R will be introduced at the 2007 Tokyo Motor Show. Ghosn was convinced that sales of the GT-R would be profitable for Nissan. Following the rumours that the GT-R would be sold as an Infiniti model in North America, he confirmed that the GT-R will be sold as a Nissan model worldwide.

Concepts 

Nissan surprisingly unveiled the GT-R concept without any announcement at the 35th Tokyo Motor Show in 2001. Previewed as the 21st-century GT-R, Nissan claimed it will be sold worldwide unlike its predecessors, which were sold only in least numbers of markets. This concept featured an aggressive, muscular, wide and low exterior look. While in the inside of the concept, it featured a deep seating position, full-length center console, integrated structural cage and a driver's command center.

Nissan unveiled a redesigned version of this concept, which was named as the GT-R Proto, at the 2005 Tokyo Motor Show. This prototype featured redesigned exterior elements over the concept car to improve overall airflow and to reveal the identity of the GT-R. These elements include; a redesigned front air intake, front fenders with air vents behind them and the sides of the body were sculptured towards the rear fenders, no technical information were revealed for both concept and prototype. Officials said the production GT-R would be 80 to 90% based on this prototype.

Testing 

Even though the overall development of the GT-R was finalized around 2006, Nissan continued testing all over the world on different road surfaces and weather conditions. In late 2005, a GT-R test mule was spied being testing at the Nürburgring, based on a highly modified Infiniti G35, which was used for the aerodynamics development of the GT-R. It had a slightly more acute roofline, hood air scoops, widened body with flared fenders, rolled out rear quarter panels and bigger dual exhaust pipes. In late 2006 and early 2007, Nissan were spied testing GT-R test mules which were seemed to be like near production vehicles alongside a Porsche 911 Turbo (997) on the Autobahn, on roads in New Mexico, Arizona and California and in racetracks such as in the Nürburgring, WeatherTech Raceway Laguna Seca, Sendai Hi-Land Raceway and Sonoma Raceway. At Laguna Seca, the GT-R posted an unofficial lap time of 1:39.62 minutes, a time marginally faster than the 911 Turbo, which was timed at 1:39.89 minutes. Also, some other test mules were spied testing on snow over in Japan.

During a test session at Sendai Hi-Land Raceway, Ghosn joined the test team to directly test the GT-R against a 911 Turbo. By the end of the session, he complimented the test team for their effort to build the GT-R in the way he wanted it to be built. Also, during a test session at Nürburgring, Nissan invited automotive magazine journalists from Car and Driver, Evo and others, to test drive both the GT-R and 911 Turbo around the Nürburgring, Autobahn and on country roads. Journalists praised the GT-R for its grip, handling and acceleration. Later during a testing session, Mizuno's team achieved a lap time of 7:38 minutes around the Nürburgring Nordschleife. The lap was done on wet track conditions, and they claimed the car was able to set a quicker lap time on ideal track conditions.

Production

Production model 

The production version of the GT-R was unveiled at 2007 Tokyo Motor Show as scheduled, right after an on-screen 7:38 minute lap time around the wet Nürburgring Nordschleife was broadcast, beating the Porsche 911 (997) Turbo as Nissan stated before introducing the car, also being the 7th fastest lap time for a production vehicle around the track. In November, 2007, Nissan revealed that the GT-R already had a considerable demand, as more than 3,000 buyers pre-ordered the car in Japan before its official launch. They also expected to sell around 200 units per each month with deliveries to begin in December, 2007 in Japan. The GT-R launched in the Japanese market on December 6, 2007. The U.S. official launch was seven months later on July 7, 2008. The first production GT-R was owned by Nissan's CEO at the time, Carlos Ghosn. Universal Nissan in Los Angeles provided a customer with the delivery of a new GT-R, fresh from the production line at 12:01 am, on July 7, 2008. The Canadian launch was also in July 2008. Europe became its third market, where it was launched in March 2009. The large disparity in initial marketing between these regional releases was due to Nissan having to build GT-R performance centers where the car was serviced.

2009 update 
While it had no improvement in engine torque, the launch control system was reprogrammed to reduce stress in the transaxle, also offering the modification for already sold 2009 models. Other upgrades included: re-tuned suspension, updated wheel finish, standard front seat and side curtain air bags.

2010 facelift 

In 2010, for the 2011 model year, the GT-R was revised, and was codenamed as "DBA–R35", replacing the original "CBA–R35". Upgrades also included: an even more rigid front strut bar made out of carbon composite, larger front brake rotors, lighter and stiffer wheels, and revised Dunlop tyres. Cosmetic changes include; a new front bumper with integrated LEDs, which improves radiator cooling and front brakes while reducing drag; A new rear diffuser, which improves downforce and additional rear cooling ducts were also added to the car. The interior was revised to improve quality. The new model was offered with a new HDD CarWings navigation system, with enhanced entertainment features and a USB port with iPod connectivity. The revised GT-R went on sale in Japan in mid-November 2010 and February 2011 in Europe, North America, and other regions.

In late 2011, Nissan put GT-R mechanicals into the Nissan Juke-R. Up to 23 vehicles were planned. A total of five cars were built by RML – two were wrecked, one left hand drive vehicle was produced for a customer and two were held by Nissan, in which one was a left hand drive, while other one was a right hand drive. It was not put into production.

2012 update 

2014 update 

In 2014, for the 2015 model year, Nissan introduced the 2015 model year GT-R, which had significant improvements over the previous model year. Along with the GT-R Nismo, it was previewed at the 2013 Tokyo Motor Show. Engine power remained as same as the previous version, but upgraded the suspension setup with revised settings, which led to reduce load fluctuation between the four wheels, increased stability and also to provide more consistent grip. The tyre contact was improved with optimized electronic controls of the shock-absorber valves. Additionally, re-tuned front stabiliser spring rates and bush links, re-tuned brake system for more stopping power, as well as the steering was also fine-tuned for better and easier handling. Cosmetic changes include, new 20-inch alloy wheels and LED headlights and taillights with Adaptive Front-lighting System (AFS). Nissan claimed these improvements led the GT-R to gain more straight-line and cornering stability, better ride quality without sacrificing its acceleration and cornering performance.

2016 facelift 

The transmission system was also refined to shift gears smoothly and quieter than before. Other upgrades include; new front and rear bumpers, improving cooling and downforce; entire interior was offered with a new leather material, including a new steering wheel; 8-inch display infotainment system with a redesigned carbon-fibre center console; 20-inch 15 spoke forged aluminium wheels; re-tuned suspension system; a titanium exhaust system and upgraded braking system. Nissan claimed these upgrades led the GT-R to have a better ride quality, increased acceleration at mid to high rpm ranges (3200 rpm and above) and also to increase cornering performance. These upgrades were also applied to the Track Edition and Nismo variants.

2019 update 

In 2019, for the 2020 model year, Nissan updated the GT-R again with minor upgrades, such as a re-tuned transmission to shift gears in just 0.15 seconds, a new lightweight forged aluminium alloy wheels, new interior and exterior colour options including the Bayside Blue body colour which was used in the Skyline GT-R R34.

2021 hiatus 
After the GT-R T-spec was unveiled, it was revealed that the GT-R would not offer a 2022 model year in North America (mid-2021 to mid-2022). However, in Japan and other markets the GT-R sold a 2022 model. Nissan Australia stopped offering the GT-R in Australia and New Zealand from October 31, 2021, as the car was no longer been eligible for the new Australian side impact regulations. Nissan have sold 1,021 units in Australia and 89 units in New Zealand, a total of 1,110 units were sold in the Australian market in a time period of 12 years since its debut in April 2009. Following the Australian market sales termination, deliveries for the European market and United Kingdom were also stopped from March 2022, due to the car being unable to meet new noise regulations which took effect in June 2022. In a 13-year sales period since March 2009, Nissan sold more than 11,000 units in Europe.

In May 2022, Nissan officially concluded orders for the GT-R in Japan, as they had reached the planned sales amount. Over 15,000 units were sold since December 2007 in Japan. Following the Japanese sales discontinuation, it was revealed the GT-R was no longer on sale in North American and African markets, as Nissan USA, Nissan Canada, and Nissan South Africa official websites claimed the GT-R was sold out, meaning that the GT-R was no longer available for sale worldwide. Around 15,500 units were sold since 2008 in North America. German automotive magazine Auto Motor und Sport claimed the GT-R was no longer in production, as production for the 2022 model year was completed. Approximately more than 40,000 units were sold worldwide.

 Reintroduction
In October 2022, for the 2023 model year, Nissan resumed production of the GT-R (skipping the 2022 model year in the U.S. market). No changes were reported compared to the previous model.

2023 facelift 

In 2023, for the 2024 model year, the GT-R was facelifted. The new version was introduced at the 2023 Tokyo Auto Salon. The car was offered only for the Japanese and North American markets, with three trims, including both Premium, Nismo trims and the T-spec variant.

Changes were, re-designed and optimized front and rear fascias, bumper sides, front grille and rear wing. These upgrades led to improve aerodynamics around the nose and rear diffuser, increased downforce without changing the drag coefficient. For the North American market, facelifted Premium and Nismo variants are expected to go on sale in the spring and summer of 2023 respectively.

Production figures 
From 2007 to 2022, Nissan produced around 40,000 GT-R units and sold in various different markets worldwide, which was one of the highest sales for a standalone generation production sports car.

Overview

Technical Specifications

Engine 

The Nissan GT-R is powered by the VR38DETT engine, a  60° degree DOHC V6 engine with plasma transferred wire arc sprayed cylinder bores. Two parallel Ishikawajima-Harima (IHI) turbochargers provide forced induction. The engine also meets California Air Resources Board Ultra Low Emission Vehicle (ULEV) standards. The VR38DETT features 24 valves controlled by dual overhead camshafts (2 per cylinder head) with intake only variable valve timing. The engine block is made out of cast aluminium with 0.15 mm (0.0059 in) plasma-sprayed cylinder liner bores. This coating provides a hard protective layer which reduces friction for the piston rings to slide on when the piston moves up and down during the power cycle. The IHI turbocharger's turbine housing is integrated into the exhaust manifolds to decrease weight and improve vehicle balance. This engine also features a pressurized lubrication system controlled thermostatically. The VR38DETT has a feedback control system which changes air fuel ratio depending on the engine load which reduces fuel consumption. Fully equipped with catalytic converters, turbochargers, all of the engine accessories, front differential assembly and turbo outlet pipes, the engine weighs 276 kg (608 lb). Notable features of the VR38DETT includes,

 Continuously variable valve timing control system (CVTCS) on intake valve.
 Aluminium cylinder block with high-endurance/low-friction plasma-sprayed bores.
 Iridium-tipped spark plugs.
 Electronic drive-by-wire throttle.
 Multi port fuel injection.
 Pressurized lubrication system with thermostatically controlled cooling and magnesium oil sump.
 Fully symmetrical dual intake and low back-pressure exhaust system.
 Secondary air intake system to rapidly heat catalysts to peak cleaning efficiency.
 50 State LEV2/ULEV.

The engines are hand built by only five trained mechanics called "Takumi Craftsmen" in a dust proof, temperature controlled room at Nissan's Yokohama plant. The names of these built are badged on every GT-R engine. Each engine takes approximately 8.3 hours for the 300 components to be fully assembled. Approximately 13 engines are built every day in a single shift. The cars are built at Tochigi plant on a shared production line. Before the production finalization, every single GT-R is test driven by a professional driver around Nissan's test track.

Drivetrain 

The GT-R was the first rear mounted independent transaxle all-wheel-drive vehicle. The transmission is an exclusively developed, rear mounted, six-speed BorgWarner designed GR6Z30A type dual-clutch automatic transmission. These units are hand built by Takumi Craftsmans in a specialized room, similar to the engine assembly room at Nissan's Aichi Kikai plant in Nagoya. This transmission is one of the fastest shifting in a production vehicle, as it shifts gears in just 0.15–0.2 seconds. This particular DCT gearbox is used in conjunction with the unique ATTESA E-TS system to provide power to all four wheels, along with Nissan's Vehicle Dynamics Control (VDC) to aid in stability. Three shift modes can be selected from the drive mode selector for various conditions: "R-mode" allows for maximum performance of the six-speed dual-clutch transmission, the "Normal-mode" is recommended for normal daily drives, and the "Save-mode" is recommended for maximizing fuel economy, as well as for driving on slippery surfaces, such as on snow or ice.

The ATTESA ET-S all-wheel-drive system was an updated version of the ATTESA E-TS Pro, was used in older Skyline GT-R models. This was a rear biased all-wheel-drive system, helping the GT-R for its incredible handling and stability at high speeds. In normal conditions, this system provides 100 percent power to the rear wheels through the main carbon-composite propeller shaft. In conditions where limited traction is available to the rear wheels, such as heavy acceleration and cornering, the separated additional propeller shaft sends torque from the transfer case to the front differential, resulting in a 50:50 front to rear power distribution. The rear differential and transmission are built as a single component called a transaxle. An open type differential distributes power in the front, and a 1.5 way multi-disc mechanical limited slip differential does so in the rear. In addition to these mechanical components, the GT-R is also capable of automatically braking either of the front wheels when slip is detected in order to send power to the other front wheel, so as to mimic the functionality of a mechanical limited slip differential.

Chassis 

The GT-R had a curb weight of  distributed 54 percent to the front and 46 percent to the rear. The chassis of the GT-R is made out of Alcoa aluminium, also used for the hood, trunk and doors, while die-cast aluminium is used for front shock towers and inner door structures. Outer body panels are stamped using a multiple-strike coining process in order to add rigidity and precision. The chassis is stiffened with a carbon-composite front cross member/radiator support. The GT-R is the only model built on Nissan's Premium Midship (PM) platform, an evolution of the Front Midship (FM) architecture introduced in the 2001 (V35) Skyline. It utilizes hybrid unibody construction using a combination of steel, carbon fiber, and die-cast aluminium.

The GT-R features an active suspension system, which contains Bilstein monotube shock absorbers. Onboard computers adjust the suspension every one hundredth of a second. The GT-R was the first production vehicle to contain such a suspension system. The Damp Tronic system allows the driver to select three different suspension modes from the suspension mode selector: "R-mode" for maximum performance required on the track and dragstrip, the "Normal-mode" for daily driver use, and "Comfort-mode", which softens the dampers and provides a comfortable ride, recommended for conditions such as long-distance driving. The Vehicle Dynamic Control (VDC), also can be changed for three different modes: "R-mode" to use during fast driving conditions such as on track and dragstrip, which lowers the traction control sensitivity but doesn't turn off the electronic stability control (ESC) fully, "Normal-mode" for daily driver use, and "Off-mode" which turns off the electronic stability control entirely. The GT-R comes with 20-inch 15-spoke forged lightweight alloy wheels manufactured by RAYS, which were wrapped with specially developed Bridgestone Potenza RE070R run-flat tyres when the car launched in 2008, or Dunlop SP Sport Maxx GT 600 DSST CTT run-flat tyres in later models. Each wheel features a knurling around the inside of the rim in order to keep the tyres from slipping on the rim under heavy acceleration and braking.

The GT-R has Brembo monoblock six-piston ventilated brake calipers at the front, and four-piston calipers in the rear. The rotors are 15.35-inch in the front and 15.0-inch in the rear. They are full floating, cross drilled two piece rotors, fitted with low steel and high stiffness brake pads. In some special variants of the GT-R, carbon-ceramic brake rotors have been offered, which are the largest brake rotors ever fitted to a Japanese production vehicle.

Exterior 

Nissan then–chief creative officer and chief design director, Shiro Nakamura, has likened the new GT-R to the giant robots of the Gundam series. Nakamura stated: "The GT-R is unique because it is not simply a copy of a European-designed sports car; it had to really reflect Japanese culture". Nissan's American designers sculpted the rear three-quarters of the vehicle, while their European designers sculpted the roofline.

Nissan have developed a 6-stage paint process with a double clear coat and chip-resistant paint for use in critical areas of the GT-R chassis. An optional liquid-effect finish employs a hand-polished 8-stage process with product-specific colours, such as the original Super Silver metallic paint, with three layers of clearcoat.

The GT-R features an overall muscular, sharp and boxy design, resulting in a high-downforce, less–draggy body design, achieved by making the air flow smoother though the overall body. Up front, NACA ducts were placed on the hood, which scoops in clean air in order cool the engine compartment. Side front fender air vents also improved the car's aero performance by improving airflow around the tyres, while cooling the engine, front bumper edges were sharpened and features air ducts and vents to improve downforce while cooling the brakes. Overall front end of the GT-R features an aggressive look, while the rear end continues the GT-R heritage, specially from carrying over those four round taillights of its predecessors. Additionally, the rear end also features air ducts and vents for further brake cooling and generates a smoother air flow, a body-coloured rear spoiler, whereas some special editions had a dry carbon-fibre rear spoiler, in order improve rear downforce. The GT-R has a 315-litre rear boot, an under body made out of carbon-fiber panels, which smoothens the air flow under the car. The overall body of the GT-R is made out of steel, aluminium and carbon-fiber.

Additionally, the production and special edition models are fitted with LED headlights, automatic on/off headlights, LED daytime running lights, LED taillights and brake lights, dual-heated body-colour power wing mirrors, power-folding side mirrors, flush-mounted aluminium door handles, four 5-inch titanium exhaust outlets with polished tips and UV-reducing solar glass.

Interior 

The GT-R has a hand stitched premium leather interior, embedded on the dashboard, steering wheel, door panels, center console, and front and back seats. Motor Trend claimed the GT-R has one of the most finely crafter interiors. Also, carbon-fiber was used in the center console and in the gauge cluster, which features an analog speedometer, tachometer which has a redline at 7,000–7,100 rpm, fuel meter, digital gear display and another digital display featuring traveling speed, fuel economy and distance calculations. GT-R badged steering wheel contained volume controls and cruise control buttons. Magnesium paddle shifters were also can be found on the wheel column in earlier models and on the steering wheel in 2017 facelifted models and newer models.

The instrument cluster was angled towards to the driver, which contained air conditioning controls, audio set-up controls and drive mode selectors of transmission, suspension and VDC. Center console contained the engine start/off button, leather–wrapped shift liver, parking brake and an openable armrest with a small storage area inside and a USB port. The GT-R also has an 11-speaker Bose sound system.

 
Polyphony Digital, creators of the Gran Turismo series of motor racing video games, were themselves involved in the development of the GT-R, having been contracted to design the GT-R's multifunction display. This multifunction display features a detailed log of the driving behavior, speed, g-force, fuel economy and more. Also, details of mechanical information such as the turbo boost, water and engine oil pressure, transmission oil, front and rear drive distribution and others, steering angles, braking and acceleration pressure and optimal gearshift mapping for the best fuel economy, satellite navigation and audio controls.

Variants

SpecV 

Nissan introduced the GT-R SpecV on January 7, 2009, at the 2009 Tokyo Auto Salon. This version used carbon fibre trims inside and out, and had no rear seats. In addition, a new colour was introduced limited to the SpecV, LAC Black Opal, The car came with Bridgestone Potenza RE070R street tyres. The GT-R SpecV was powered by the standard twin-turbocharged  V6 engine. A new high gear boost controller that allows a temporary increase in boost pressure from the IHI twin turbochargers, now larger than those on the standard GT-R, delivering  more torque than the standard GT-R in mid to high-range revs. Other mechanical changes include a titanium exhaust, Recaro bucket seats, reworked suspension, carbon ceramic brakes, and  Nismo wheels.

Sales began in Japan on February 2, 2009, at seven preselected dealers staffed with specially trained mechanics knowledgeable about racing circuit driving. The SpecV was also sold in Europe and the Middle East. A total of 110 SpecV were built, 77 for Japan, 24 for Europe, 1 for United Kingdom, 7 for Middle East and 1 additional car. Auto Express tested the SpecV and posted a  time of 3.2 seconds, pulled 1.12 g on the skidpad and 120.2 km/h in the slalom. An earlier tested Chevrolet Corvette C6 ZR1 resulted in an identical slalom speed but a lower 1.06 g on the skidpad. Road & Track achieved a  time of 11.0 seconds. Japanese motor publication Best Motoring, tested the SpecV around the Nürburgring Nordschleife, achieved a lap time of 7:34.46 minutes on semi–wet track conditions.

In November 2011, Nismo introduced a performance package, named Track Pack Edition, which provides the upgraded accessories of the SpecV version. Including the Bilstein adjustable suspension, brake radiator air guide, Rays forged aluminium alloy wheels, carbon fibre front spoiler with air guide and etc. The rear seat was removed in order to reduce weight, and it was also equipped with high friction special anti-skid bucket seat. It went on sale on November 24, 2011, and was exported to other regions in January 2012, was limited to 150 units worldwide.

Egoist 

Nissan introduced the GT-R Egoist (known as VVIP Edition in the Middle East) as a luxury version of the GT-R for the 2012 model year, which was only produced in the Japanese, European and Middle East markets only with 43 units (2 VVIP Editions). The new upgrades to the GT-R Egoist include; increased engine power output to 530 PS; 523 hp (390 kW) at 6,400 rpm and torque to 607 N⋅m (448 lb⋅ft) at 3,200–5,800 rpm, which helped to improve straight-line performance, this model can accelerate from 0 to 60 mph in 2.9 seconds, and completes the quarter-mile in 11.2 seconds at 122.7 mph. Interior upgrades include; a Wajima Lacquer steering emblem, exclusive leather and Alcantara suede for instrument panel, console, door trim, rear side, pillar trim and roof trim, new leather interior colour, fabric carpet, leather cleaner, leather car verification case, and leather seats. For the exterior a new dry carbon-fibre rear spoiler was fitted with LED-type high-mount brake light, a titanium muffler, and exhaust system, dedicated emblem, and Rays lightweight forged aluminium wheels with carbon-ceramic brakes.

The VVIP Edition was introduced by Nissan Middle East and it was offered in the Middle East. VVIP version upgrades include, interior colours among 12 choices (four upper area interior colours and seven lower area interior colours), new racing seats, Wajima Lacquer (Maki-e) emblem on the center of the steering wheel, new Bose precision sound system and dry carbon-fibre rear spoiler. The wheels, front shells, and some other small components were painted in unique gold paint. Nissan sold 35 Egoist units in Japan, 3 in the United Kingdom, 3 in Europe, and 2 VVIP Editions in the Middle East.

Black Edition 

In 2012, for the 2013 model year, Nissan introduced the GT-R Black Edition which was offered with exclusive 20-inch Rays wheels and a carbon-fibre rear spoiler. Recaro racing seats were commissioned specifically by Nissan for the Black Edition. The interior was finished in red and black leather, but a beige colour known as 'Pale Ivory' is also available. No mechanical changes were made from the standard GT-R. In a test conducted by Motor Trend, the GT-R Black Edition accelerated from 0 to 60 mph (97 km/h) in 2.8 seconds and completed a quarter-mile in 11.1 seconds at 124.8 mph (200.8 km/h).

The GT-R Black Edition returned with the updated 2017 model year GT-R, but Recaro seats were the only upgrade was offered over the standard GT-R. The Black Edition wasn't offered in the North American market, only offered in countries such as the United Kingdom as the Recaro Edition.

Track Edition 

In 2013, for the 2014 model year, Nissan introduced the GT-R Track Edition (also known as GT-R Track Edition Engineered by Nismo), which was limited for 150 units and offered with no rear seats (saving  over the Black Edition) and was added with stiffer suspension, carbon fibre air inlets, titanium exhaust, improved brake cooling, a unique front spoiler, and new black and gray leather Recaro front seats.

 2019 update
At the 2019 New York Auto Show, Nissan introduced the 2020 model year GT-R Track Edition. Resulting a 20% increase in acceleration reaction time compared to the previous model year GT-R Track Edition. Other upgrades include; Nismo tuned independent suspension system, carbon-fibre roof, wider Nismo front fenders, new Rays 20-inch Nismo forged aluminium alloy wheels with Dunlop 255/40RF-20 run-flat SP Sport Maxx GT 600 DSST Nismo-spec tyres, Nismo carbon ceramic brakes and dry carbon-fibre rear spoiler. The updated Track Edition includes re-designed red and black colour treatment for the interior with high-grip Recaro bucket seats.

Gentleman Edition 
Nissan introduced the GT-R Gentleman Edition in 2012, which was offered only in France and Belgium. Nissan built 10 units of this model and was based on the 2014 model year GT-R Black Edition, the Gentleman Edition was offered with the exclusive Grey Squale body colour and featured "Gentleman Edition" badges next to the front fender vents. Other upgrades include; amber red leather upholstery, individually numbered titanium plaque, hand-stitched leather accents and a bespoke sunglass case.

Midnight Opal Special Edition 
In July 2013, Nissan introduced the Midnight Opal Special Edition, which was expected to produce 100 units but comprehensively, 115 units were built. The new model's upgrades include; new Midnight Opal body colour (similar to the Midnight Purple body colour offered in the Nissan Skyline GT-R), carbon rear spoiler (with LED high-mount brake light), increased antifreeze concentration, new lightweight RAYS forged aluminium wheels with a unique hyper titanium colour, Gold aluminium model number plate in the engine bay and a new SRS curtain airbag system. Nissan sold 48 units in Japan, 50 in the United States, 3 in Europe, 9 in the Middle East, 1 in Korea and 1 in Taiwan.

Nismo 

Nissan introduced the track focused, GT-R Nismo at 2013 Tokyo Motor Show, which was the fastest production vehicle around the Nürburgring Nordschleife at the time, with a lap time of 7:08.679 minutes, driven by Nissan test driver Michael Krumm.

The  time changed to 2.5 seconds. The gear-ratios did not change in the dual-clutch transmission. Additionally, front and rear brake cooling ducts were added, a full Nismo tuned suspension and brakes were installed, including a hollow  rear stabilizer bar from the Nismo performance division. Nismo-exclusive Rays 20-inch forged alloys wheels with Nismo-spec Dunlop SP Sport Maxx GT 600 DSST CTT run-flat tyres, standard aluminium trunk lid was replaced with a full carbon-fibre panel, additional spot welds to strengthen the chassis, a larger front splitter with carbon fibre air ducts and a larger carbon-fibre rear wing were added to the special Nismo aerodynamic package. The Nismo edition was also offered with interior changes, including the Recaro bucket seats with black and red colour synthetic suede treatment, instrument binnacle and steering wheel were also covered in with the Alcantara synthetic suede, deletion of the active noise control in the Bose stereo system and red colour accents in the gauge meter. The car was offered with the Nismo-specific low-gloss matte gray paint colour and full titanium exhaust with additional heatsinks.

 2019 update

At the 2019 New York Auto Show, Nissan unveiled the 2020 model year GT-R Nismo along with the 50th anniversary GT-R, celebrating the 50th anniversary of the GT-R. The updated GT-R Nismo was offered with, a new "R mode" gear shifting setting which shifts gears quicker than before, new turbochargers from the GT-R Nismo GT3 race car to improve acceleration, lighter Rays 20-inch forged alloy wheels with specifically developed Dunlop tyres, GT3-inspired fender vents, lightweight carbon-ceramic brakes which was the largest brake rotors to be ever fitted to a Japanese production car at the time, new re-tuned suspension, and the roof, hood and fenders were offered in carbon-fibre to reduce weight. Nissan claimed the new GT-R Nismo was faster and more track-focused than the previous model, these upgrades led the car to reduce its weight to 1,703 kg (3,754 lb), which was 20 kg (44 lb) lighter compared to the 2017–2019 model year GT-R Nismo.

Also, according to Nissan, the upgraded GT-R Nismo was 2.5 seconds quicker than the previous model year around their test track.

 2023 update

In 2023, the 2024 model year facelift saw the biggest upgrades for the GT-R Nismo throughout the years. A front-limited slip deferential, swan neck rear wing with a 10 percent increase in surface area, revised front lip canards and rear diffuser were added to aid increase downforce, handling and overall stability. The car also featured a new carbon-fiber bucket seat. Nismo Appearance Package was introduced, which offered the special exterior features of the GT-R Nismo Special Edition. Including the exclusive Stealth Grey body colour, clear coated carbon-fiber hood, exclusive engine cover and the red-accented Nismo wheels.

 GT-R Nismo N-Attack Package

A special post-production package for the GT-R Nismo was offered by Nismo, which includes the exact upgrades of the GT-R Nismo, used to set its lap time around the Nürburgring. The upgrades include, re-programmed ECU, retuned suspension springs and shock absorbers, new anti-roll bars, new front brake pads, a new carbon-fibre front fender with an aerodynamic flic, a new carbon-fibre front splitter, and a larger carbon-fibre rear wing with two height and 12 angle adjustment options, new carbon-fibre intercooler pipes, new front and rear limited-slip differentials, new Recaro full-carbon bucket seats and a carbon-fibre bulkhead in place of the back seats. According to Nissan, this package removes 64 kg (143 lb) of weight from the standard GT-R Nismo, and was also offered for the 2017 model year GT-R Nismo. This particular package was offered as A kit and B kit, in which the A kit had all the upgrades while the B kit only had, the suspension system, brake system, stabilizer bars, all carbon-fibre rear wing, front fenders and front splitter, both ESM and TCM and a driver only bucket seat. In Japan, installation was handled by Nismo Omori factory. In North America and United Kingdom, the conversion was handled by STILLEN and JR Motorsports respectively.

45th Anniversary Gold Edition 
Nissan introduced the limited production GT-R 45th Anniversary Gold Edition, which had an improved ride quality compared to other models. It went on sale in the beginning of February 2015. The car was painted in a unique gold-colour paint, called Silica Brass, which was used in the Nissan Skyline GT-R R34 M-Spec. Other upgrades include; a gold-tone VIN plate in the engine compartment, a commemorative plaque on the interior center console, new LED headlights, taillights, and brake lights, fully black coloured interior, new 20-spoke Rays wheels finished in black colour and the limited production vehicle number plate under the hood. Nissan built 80 units of this edition, sold 25 in Japan, 27 in United States, 5 in United Kingdom, 2 in Mainland Europe, 16 in Middle East, 4 in Australia and one additional car for testing and press use.

GT-R50 

To celebrate the 50th anniversary of the GT-R, Nissan announced in 2019, that they will introduce a limited-production GT-R called the GT-R50. Only 50 cars were expected to be produced. Upgrades to the engine include; large diameter turbochargers shared with the GT-R Nismo GT3, a heavy-duty crankshaft, pistons and connecting rods, a modified intake system, a new exhaust system, a recalibrated gearbox, and a reinforced differential. The rear suspension system used Bilstein continuously variable dampers and carbon-ceramic brakes. The GT-R50 was offered with 21-inch carbon-fibre wheels and Michelin Pilot Super Sport tyres. The body was designed by Nissan in collaboration with Italdesign, with the former celebrating its 50th anniversary in 2018. Construction of the bodywork is mainly made out of aluminium and carbon-fibre. It was originally shown as a concept car not intended for production. Nissan claimed, the production of those 50 units were delayed until 2020, due to modifications required to make it road legal.

The design was developed by a team of Nissan's European and American designers and has been described as a "car within a car". The front and back sections were designed so they appear to be emerging from the bodywork. Key design elements include a redesigned rear section, stretched LED headlamps at the front, a power bulge on the hood, a lowered roofline, and "Samurai blade" cooling ducts behind the front wheels.

The first production version of the GT-R50 was revealed in May 2020 in Italy. It retains all the design elements of the concept car, such as the new headlamps, bumper designs, splitters, rocker panels, active rear wing, hollow taillamps, and dual tailpipes. In July 2022, Nissan stopped accepting orders for the GT-R50, as all of those 50 units were sold out.

Naomi Osaka Edition 

Nissan introduced the GT-R Naomi Osaka Edition in September 2018, as a 2019 model year. Nissan described that they offered this car to celebrate the partnership in between Nissan brand ambassador Naomi Osaka. Nissan planned to build 50 units of this particular model with the specifications of the standard GT-R. The car was offered with three body colours, including; Midnight Opal, Brilliant White Pearl and Meteor Flake Black Pearl. Both exterior and interior colour options were chosen by Osaka herself. Interior colours include; Ivory, Amber Red and Tan with Urban Black coloured seats. Additionally, a carbon rear spoiler (with LED high-mount brake light), Gold aluminium model number plate in the engine compartment, SRS curtain airbag system, privacy glass, increased antifreeze concentration and dark grey front fender outlet ducts were also offered.

50th Anniversary Edition 

Nissan introduced the 50th Anniversary Edition at the 2019 New York Auto Show. Nissan introduced two-tone exterior colours – Bayside (Wangan) Blue, with white racing stripes, blue accents on the wheel spokes, and Pearl White with red stripes and Super Silver with white stripes also available for the GT-R 50th Anniversary Edition. Also, the car include; a unique steering wheel and shift knob trim, special embossed seats, Alcantara headliner with unique stitching and Alcantara-wrapped sun visors.

Nismo Special Edition 

On April 15, 2021, for the 2022 model year (as a 2021 model year in United States), Nissan unveiled a new, built-to-order, GT-R Nismo Special Edition (known as GT-R Nismo SV in Japan and Australian market) along with the standard GT-R Nismo, both models were limited to 300 units. The Special Edition went on sale in Japan in October 2021. It was offered with the new, Nismo-exclusive, Nismo Stealth Gray body colour, which was inspired by track tarmacs that the GT-R has set records on and competed on. The Special Edition featured a Nismo-exclusive clear-coated carbon-fibre hood, reducing 100 grams of weight compared to the standard GT-R Nismo. The edition-exclusive 20-inch Rays aluminium forged wheels had a red accent that matches existing accents around the body. The new Nissan logo was unveiled on the Nissan Ariya adorns the rear trunk lid and wheel center caps.

The built-to-order special edition used new, high-precision weight-balanced parts including the piston rings, connecting rods, flywheel, crank pulley and valve springs dialed in with tighter tolerances, delivering snappier revs and quicker turbo spooling. Despite each engines were handcrafted by its own Takumi technician, the Takumi certification plate on the engine was offered in an exclusive red colour. By August 6, 2021, all 300 units were sold out and Nissan stopped accepting orders for the GT-R Nismo and Special Edition from customers. According to Nissan, 99% of customers chose to buy the GT-R Nismo Special Edition.

T-spec 

On September 14, 2021, Nissan introduced the T-spec model of the GT-R via its official YouTube channel. T-spec was inspired by words "Trend Maker" and "Traction Master", which were used to represent the first GT-R concept back in 2001. This particular model was limited for 100 units, in which only 50 units were offered in United States, 28 in the Australian market and the rest in other markets. The T-spec had some exclusive upgrades and changes over the standard GT-R. Including; Millennium Jade and Midnight Purple exterior colours which were used in Skyline GT-R R34 special editions, exclusive gold and black engine cover, even wider front fenders, carbon-fibre rear spoiler, Rays forged wheels finished in bronze colour, Nismo carbon ceramic brakes, GT-R Nismo air ducts, suspension weight reduction below the springs, T-spec badging in both interior and exterior, new interior with plenty of leather, suede and Alcantara finished in a new colour named Mori Green, increased wheel-rim width for better tyre rigidity and smooth, sensitive handling, exclusive carbon-fibre roof and trunk lid for Track Edition T-spec. The T-spec trim was offered in both standard and GT-R Track Edition trims. Nissan began taking orders from September 15–29, 2021. Sales began in the second half of October along with the GT-R Nismo Special Edition as a 2022 model year (as a 2021 model year in United States).

One-offs

Bolt Edition 

In 2012, an "Usain Bolt" one-off GT-R was built by Nissan and auctioned off to raise funds for charity along with a display model held in Tokyo, Japan. In 2013, another one was built and delivered to Usain Bolt. Bolt's personal car had gray wheels, a "Spec Bolt" badge and an Egoist edition white colour style interior. Licence plate was "7300GJ", corresponding to Jamaica. The displayed car had grey chrome wheels but no Bolt Spec badges and a black interior with red accents along the edge of the seat. It had a license plate with the words "MR BOLT" on them. After being displayed, it was moved to the Nissan Heritage Museum, Zama where it was exhibited. Rod Maher of Australia won the auctioned vehicle at the charity eBay auction. This car was delivered as an Australian specification GT-R and had gold wheels, a black interior but no red accents or Bolt Spec badges.

Fastest drift vehicle 

Tests began at Fuji Speedway in Japan with professional drifting driver, Masato Kawabata. End of the tests, the GT-R broke the record at Fujairah International Airport, UAE. Three attempts were undertaken by the Nissan Middle East's organization. There were three attempts with driver Masato Kawabata for the record, on his third attempt, the car broke the record with a trap speed of 304.96 km/h at a 30-degree angle drift.

Predzilla 
The GT-R Predzilla was specially built and based on a 2017 model year GT-R and donated to the Nashville Predators Foundation. This particular GT-R was the main attraction in the Predators Foundation fundraising auction, as the car was custom-painted in Preds' official colours and graphics and featured a carbon fibre rear spoiler, especially the blue colour painted Rays wheels and a black coloured interior.

GT-R/C 
Nissan built this car to celebrate the release of Gran Turismo Sport video game and to mark 20 years of Nissan involvement in the Gran Turismo gaming series. The car was extensively modified to be driven entirely by a DualShock 4 controller. The GT-R/C was controlled by the Nismo athlete and GT Academy winner Jann Mardenborough around in a cockpit of a helicopter at the Silverstone Circuit. Mardenborough's fastest lap was 1:17.47 minutes, averaging 122 km/h and reached a top speed of 211 km/h. The GT-R/C was fitted with four robots that operate the steering, transmission, brakes, and throttle. Six computers mounted in the rear of the car to update the controls up to 100 times per second.

The unmodified Dual-Shock 4 connects to a micro-computer that interprets the joystick and button signals and transmits them to the cars' onboard systems. The wireless operation had a primary control range of one kilometre. To help Mardenborough judge the vehicle's speed through the corners, a Racelogic VBOX Motorsport sensor was installed to relay speed data to an LCD display in the helicopter cockpit. The GT-R/C was also fitted with two independent safety systems operating on different radio frequencies in order to allow two additional operators to apply full ABS braking and cut the engine in the event of the main operator losing control of the vehicle. In 2018, the GT-R/C was used in a tour of primary and secondary schools in the UK to promote future careers in STEM (Science, Technology, Engineering, and Math) subjects.

McDonald's Tomica Happy Set 
On April 15, 2021, Nissan unveiled a one-Off special version of the GT-R Nismo. This one-off was based on the 2022 model year GT-R Nismo Special Edition and wrapped in a gold body colour. In collaboration with McDonald's in Japan, a miniature toy car GT-R Nismo was offered in the “Tomica Happy Set" (a popular McDonald's meal set for children). To promote this, Nissan and McDonald's held a joint event at Nissan's headquarters in Yokohama. The Happy Set was on sale for a limited time in Japan, began on April 30, 2021.

Police use 

The GT-R was used as police vehicles by several police departments over the years. Including; the Tochigi Police Department Japan, Abu Dhabi Police, Dubai Police Force in United Arab Emirates and a one-off police vehicle, named Copzilla which was shown at the 2017 New York Auto Show. The Copzilla wasn't an in service police vehicle.

Performance 

Many automotive publications have expressed, "the GT-R defies the laws of physics" to describe its performance capabilities, as it have set numerous acceleration records and lap records during tests conducted by Nissan and automotive publications as well. In acceleration tests, the original production model was shown to be capable of achieving 0- times as low as 3.2 seconds using "launch control". Owners expressed concern that duplicating the times achieved in these tests would void their factory warranty. Then-GT-R chief engineer, Kazutoshi Mizuno has indicated that he has never used the term "launch control", which refers to the act of turning off Vehicle Dynamic Control (VDC) and launching the car at around 4,500 rpm. However, then-Nissan director of product planning officer, John Wiener stated in an interview with Jay Leno that "we [Nissan] actually offer a 'launch mode'". The GT-R user's manual states that turning off the VDC is only meant for escaping low-traction situations such as mud or snow. However Nissan used to turn off the VDC during hot laps and time attacks. Nissan has re-programmed the 2010 model year GT-R to reduce the engine speed at launch to around 3,500–4,000 rpm with VDC enabled, which is meant to improve acceleration times. The new programming was also installed on old 2009 model year vehicles still in Nissan's inventory, and is available for existing 2009 vehicles.

The updated GT-R now has a launch mode called "R-Mode Start". Pushing the three buttons up, including the transmission, suspension and VDC, the car gets to "R-Mode Start". The updated GT-R now combined with "R-Mode Start" has lowered the 0- time to 3.2 seconds, set a Guinness World Record for the fastest accelerating four-seater production vehicle. Nissan's upgrades for later model years saw further improvements in acceleration figures, top speed, and Nürburgring lap times.

Acceleration 

 Notes

In 2013, in a joint project of Nissan Russia and LAV Productions, a 2012 model year GT-R set the ice speed record for a production car at Lake Baikal, southern Siberia, Russia. The record was set by Russian racing driver Roman Rusinov, with a trap speed of 294.8 km/h (183 mph). This lake is considered as the deepest lake of the world. According to Nissan, the record car was in standard specifications with standard Bridgestone tyres.

Official Nürburgring Nordschleife lap times 

The GT-R is well known for its record breaking Nürburgring Nordschleife lap times, as since the launch of the car, Nissan conducted several time attack tests for the GT-R around the Nordschleife throughout the years. Beginning from 2009, Nissan claimed a lap time of 7:26.7 minutes for the 2009 model year GT-R on Dunlop SP Sport Maxx GT 600 DSST CTT run-flat tyres, it was the fastest four-seater production vehicle and 7th fastest production vehicle around the Nordschleife. Having previously set a time of 7:29 minutes on standard Bridgestone Potenza RE070R street tyres. Porsche has stated Nissan overstated the GT-R's performance in September 2008, claimed they have conducted a test of a factory stock, European market GT-R and achieved a slower time (of 7:54 minutes), apparently implying that the car isn't as fast around this public road as Nissan claimed and/or that their driver isn't as talented as Nissan's. Nissan disputed the former and implied the latter claim in October 2008.

In September 2010, Nissan returned to the Nordschleife in order to set the fastest production car lap record, using the facelifted 2011 model year GT-R. In its first run around the track, GT-R development driver, Toshio Suzuki achieved a lap time of 7:24.22 minutes, which was a 2-second improvement over the previous lap time. Despite having poor track conditions, Nissan could not improve their lap time, had to settle down with the unofficial 7:24.22 minute lap time. It was the 5th fastest lap time for a production vehicle around the track. According to Nissan, the GT-R improved its Nordschleife lap time in October 2012 to 7:19.1 minutes, by due to the 2013 model year improvements. Allowing the GT-R to regain its 5th fastest ever production vehicle title around the Nordschleife, equalling the Porsche 911 (997.2) GT2 RS. Nissan claimed that it lost half a second due to traffic, making a potential lap time of 7:18.6 minutes possible.

In February 2013, Nissan opened the new Nismo headquarters in Yokohama. Nissan's then–CEO Carlos Ghosn considered to introduce a track-oriented version of the GT-R, named as GT-R Nismo. He wanted the GT-R Nismo to set the production vehicle lap record at the Nürburgring Nordschleife, and also to be sold as the leading Nismo brand within a year period. On May 18 development of the GT-R Nismo was launched, with Nissan's chief vehicle engineer Noboru Kaneko, who was appointed after the retirement of Mizuno, led the joint Nismo and Dunlop Tyres effort to achieve their goal at the Nürburgring.

On June 26, the team began testing with standard GT-R test mules at Sendai Hi-Land Raceway. On July 16, the team visited Nürburgring to collect data and aid development. The team returned to Japan, and built the GT-R Nismo using information and data from that visit to Nürburgring. The aerodynamic development was finalized, following a testing session at Sendai Raceway on July 24.

On September 2, the team returned to the Nürburgring with three GT-R Nismo prototypes (in the same specification of the N-Attack Package) and four drivers, including; Infiniti Red Bull Racing reserve driver, Sébastien Buemi; Nismo brand ambassador and racing driver, Michael Krumm; former German touring car driver, Armin Hahne; and a Japanese racing driver, Tetsuya Tanaka. Team finalized testing of the GT-R Nismo and on September 30, the team was aiming for a lap under 7:10 minutes. All four drivers were offered with 2 laps each, Hahne and Tanaka could not get close enough to the target lap time. But Buemi completed a lap time of 7:12 minutes on his first attempt, on his second attempt, he stopped to take some fuel out to reduce weight, while on the way to complete a lap under 7:10 minutes, the car ran out of fuel, forcing him to abort his hot lap. Krumm achieved a lap time of 7:10 minutes on his first attempt.

After setting the lap record, the Nismo team invited Car and Driver journalist, Tony Quiroga for a lap around the track.

Independent Nürburgring lap times 
In a test conducted by Drivers Republic of a GT-R and Porsche 911 (997) GT2 resulted in times of 7:56 minutes for the GT-R and 7:49 minutes for the GT2 respectively in partially damp conditions. While the tester had no doubt that the GT2 could achieve the factory time of 7:32 minutes, he could not imagine the customer GT-R going faster than 7:41 minutes in spite of the 7:29 minutes of factory claim.

The German magazine Sport Auto achieved a time of 7:50 minutes on the Nürburgring with a car supplied to them by Nissan during an initial short test in 2007 in partially damp condition. In 2009, in a full "Supertest", Sport Auto achieved a lap time of 7:38 minutes around the Nürburgring with a standard GT-R driven by Horst von Saurma, identical to a later "Supertest" Chevrolet Corvette ZR1 time. In a test with the 2011 facelifted GT-R, Sport Auto recorded a lap time of 7:34 minutes around the track with a standard customer-spec GT-R, which was also driven by Saurma.

Note: These tests were done with customer specification vehicles with standard fuel, journalist drivers, traffic and safety systems, such as electronic stability control (ESC).

Lap records 

Note: Some of these lap times were only considered as lap records for being the fastest lap time recorded around the respective racetrack.

CBA Models 
 Autodrom Moscow
In October 2009, in a test conducted by Autoreview, the GT-R set a production car lap record around the Autodrom Moscow, with a lap time of 1:49.16 minutes.

 Buttonwillow Raceway Park
In Road & Track's first road test, the GT-R was compared against its main rivals at the time, the Porsche 911 GT2 (997) and Chevrolet Corvette C6 Z06, at the Buttonwillow Raceway Park. Driven by Steve Millen, the GT-R set a lap time of 1:56.9 minutes. Beating the previous production car lap record holder, Porsche 911 GT2 (997) by over 5 seconds.

 Castle Combe Circuit
In December 2009, in an Autocar magazine comparison test of a GT-R, Porsche 911 (997) Turbo and Audi R8, the GT-R managed to set the production car lap record at Castle Combe Circuit, in damp conditions, the record lap time was 1:14.60 minutes, driven by Steve Sutcliffe.

 Driving Center Groß Dölln
In November 2009, the GT-R set a lap time of 1:27.30 minutes, around the Driving Center Groß Dölln circuit, it was the fastest lap time for a production vehicle at the time. It was done by the German car magazine Auto Bild, in a comparison test, beating the Porsche 911 (997) Turbo.

 Korea International Circuit
In an episode of Top Gear Korea TV show, the GT-R broke the production car lap record around the Korea International Circuit, driven by The Stig, it set a lap time of 1:33.46 minutes.

 Mobility Resort Motegi
In May 2008, in a test conducted by Best Motoring, the GT-R completed a lap time of 2:07.60 minutes, around the Mobility Resort Motegi circuit, driven by Naoki Hattori, the result was being the fastest production vehicle around the track at the time.

 Zwartkops Raceway
In September 2009, Car magazine conducted a test for the GT-R at Zwartkops Raceway. The car set a lap time of 1:11.55 minutes, the fastest lap time recorded in a production vehicle around at the time.

DBA Models 
 Contidrom 3.8 km Course
In August 2015, Auto Bild tested the GT-R on the 3.8 km course of Contidrom race track. They achieved a lap time of 1:30.73 minutes, making it the fastest production car around the track.

 Inde Motorsports Ranch
In a comparison test conducted by Road & Tack against a Chevrolet Camaro ZL1, the GT-R set the production car lap record around the Inde Motorsports Ranch with a lap time of 1:40.45 minutes.

 Killarney Motor Racing Complex
In a test conducted by Topar magazine, the GT-R set a lap time of 1:19.79 minutes around the Killarney Motor Racing Complex, which was the fastest lap time for a production car around the track.

 Llandow Circuit
In August 2015, Auto Express conducted a comparison test between the GT-R and the Nissan Skyline GT-R R34 at the Llandow Circuit. The GT-R set a lap time of 45.70 around the track, driven by Sutcliffe, it was fastest lap time recorded in a production vehicle around the track at the time.

 Sportsland Sugo
In January 2011, in a time attack challenge conducted by Best Motoring, the GT-R achieved a lap time of 1:33.808 minutes around Sportsland Sugo circuit, driven by Keiichi Tsuchiya, making it the fastest production vehicle around the track.

 Suzuka International Racing Course
In an unofficial testing session, the GT-R reportedly have set the lap record for a production car around the Suzuka International Racing Course, with a lap time of 2:18.36 minutes. In 2015 the record was broken by a Koenigsegg One:1, which was just eight tenth of a second (0.8 seconds) quicker than the GT-R. However the Koenigsegg One:1 was not able to qualify as a production car, due to only 6 units have built out of the required 25 units.

4BA Models 
 Athens Circuit - Megara
On November 10, 2016, in a test conducted by Drive Magazine at the Athens Circuit - Megara, the GT-R archived a lap time of 1:06.68 minutes. Driven by Alex Galanopoulos next to a passenger in the car, it was the lap record for a production vehicle around the track at the time.

Nismo 
 Fuji Speedway
In a pre-testing session of the GT-R Nismo N-Attack Package at the Fuji Speedway, the car set a new production car lap record around the track. Driven by Tsugio Matsuda, set a lap time of 1:50.930 minutes.

 INTA Circuit
In 2018, Nissan Spain conducted a test around the INTA Circuit for a 2017 model year GT-R Nismo, GT-R Track Edition, and a standard GT-R, driven by Marc Gené, the GT-R Nismo set a new production vehicle lap record around the track with a lap time of 1:05.83 minutes. The GT-R Track Edition lapped in 1:06.39 minutes and held second place, as the standard GT-R lapped in 1:06.93 minutes and held third place, for production vehicle lap times around the track.

 Goodwood Circuit

In June 2014, the GT-R Nismo prototype equipped with the N-Attack Package was revealed at the Goodwood Festival of Speed. The car was driven on the Goodwood track by Jann Mardenborough, set a time of 49.27 seconds, making it the fastest production vehicle around the track.

 Nürburgring GP 5.15 km Course
On August 13, 2014, the German car magazine Sport Auto tested the 2015 model year GT-R Nismo around the Nürburgring GP 5.15 km circuit, driven by Christian Gebhardt, he took alternative racing lines due to traffic, but still managed set the fastest production vehicle lap time around the track with a lap time of 2:13.80 minutes.

 Maze Sea Circuit
In a track battle conducted by Best Motoring at Maze Sea Circuit (also known as Nihonkai Maze Circuit), a 2017 model year GT-R Nismo set a new production car lap record around the track with a lap time of 1:03.448 minutes, driven by Tsuchiya.

 Tsukuba Circuit
On December 8, 2017, in a test conducted by Nissan for the 50th anniversary of the GT-R, a 2018 model year GT-R Nismo, driven by Kazuo Shimizu, set a lap time of 1.00.293 minutes around the Tsukuba Circuit – making it the fastest production vehicle around the track at the time. On December 9, 2019, Nissan again broke its own lap record for a fastest production vehicle around the track, using an updated 2020 model year GT-R Nismo, driven by Matsuda, set a lap time of 59.361 seconds. It was the first production car to lap the circuit under a minute.

 Willow Springs International Motorsports Park
In February 2015, Motor Trend held a comparison test between a GT-R Nismo and Chevrolet Corvette C7 Z06, In the track test, test driver Randy Pobst drove the GT-R Nismo at Willow Springs International Motorsports Prak circuit, and set a new production vehicle lap record around the track, with a lap time of 1:25.70 minutes.

 Willow Springs - Street of Willow
In September 2014, Motor Trend conducted a test using the 2015 model year GT-R Nismo at Willow Springs - Street of Willow circuit. Test driver Pobst set a lap time of 1:19.07 minutes, it was the fastest lap time recorded by a production vehicle around track. The 2014 model year GT-R Track Edition held second place with a lap time of 1:19.55 minutes and 2012 model year standard GT-R held third place with a lap time of 1:20.25 minutes for production vehicles around track.

Reception 

The Nissan GT-R has been praised by various magazines, television programs, and automotive publications for its ultimate performance capabilities and daily drivable practicality, continuing its predecessor's nicknames (such as "Godzilla" and "Supercar Killer") since its debut in 2007. The GT-R was known to boast a performance equalling or even exceeding its competitors at around half the price, and possesses extensive aftermarket modifications, tunability and reliability. It also brought highly notable Nürburgring lap times and new technologies to the automotive industry, such as being the first rear-mounted, independent transaxle vehicle, being one of the earliest vehicles to use a dual-clutch transmission and launch control. These led the GT-R to obtain its current recognition in the automotive industry.

Magazines 
Motor Trend called the GT-R as, "Godzilla" in their reviews, tests and drag races. In the first acceleration test in 2009, they praised the GT-R's launch control, stating "BAM! The GT-R leaves the line like an arrow from a cross-bow. From the outside, the rear tyres spin for a little over a foot, the fronts never visibly slip. The acceleration screen on the centre dash confirms the test equipment's assertion that longitudinal acceleration of at least 1.0 g persists for almost two seconds. No wonder the forged-aluminium rims have little knurled ridges to keep the tyre beads from slipping." They have also stated that the GT-R "appears to dodge the laws of physics", while criticized for not being offered with a manual transmission and interior quality, they nevertheless named it the 2009 Motor Trend Automobile of the Year.

In Car and Driver'''s first test, they have given the GT-R a positive verdict, claimed "Prejudged on its specs, the GT-R is winning on appeal", despite of its acceleration, handling, and practicality performance. Edmunds also have praised the GT-R, stating "the Nissan GT-R delivers true supercar performance in a user-friendly package for less coin than a base Porsche 911", also claiming "the GT-R can get you to 60 mph faster than any Ferrari or Lamborghini currently in production".Top Gear magazine praised the GT-R, stating "This car is the greatest performance bargain of this or any other century, and is one of the most incredible cars of any kind ever built. For the price of a BMW M3, you have a four-wheel-drive, super-high-tech, all-weather, 195mph supercar with tremendous ability on all roads and an almost impossibly cool image. And a boot".

In the first test of Road & Track, they have given a positive verdict for the GT-R, praising the smoothness of the engine's power delivery and the lack of lag from its small turbochargers. They went on to say that the brakes could be used to induce oversteer, noting that "steering effort is light, and the all-wheel-drive system takes much of the drama out of exiting corners". Regarding the practicality of the car, the magazine states, "There's plenty of room for a big guy and a back seat that can be used by shorter folks ... The ride is on the harsh side, even with the suspension setting switched to full comfort. The various screens of the monitor are neat, though some of the materials here could be better." In the end, the magazine's verdict about the GT-R was that it "might well be considered the most exotic car on the planet".

In the Autocar magazine, Chris Harris criticized the GT-R for having a harsh/uncomfortable ride quality, stating "with the three-way dampers set to hard, it is undriveable", but praised its performance and drivetrain, claimed "There is only one performance car with a better powertrain than the GT-R, and it is made by Bugatti at considerable cost. With the double-clutch gearbox set to automatic you only feel a slight judder from first to second and thereafter it is, for want of a less sickly phrase, seamless" and "there is real sophistication to the way it handles. And, unlike its predecessor, the R35 doesn't just spit you in to oversteer. It simply catapults you away from slow turns". In the end, the motor journalist stated "I want one now! If you can't wait for a UK car some time next year then you'll need to personally import one. But believe me: if you're after the ultimate performance weapon of the moment, there is every reason to. This is the best value performance car on the planet".

 TV Series 
In series 11 of the British motoring show Top Gear, Jeremy Clarkson praised the GT-R's acceleration by stating, "I think they've put a million horsepower engine, because the acceleration is blistering, it's just savage!". Clarkson also complimented its cornering performance, claimed "they haven't built a new car here, they built a new yardstick" and "it corners faster than electricity". He was forced to end the test prematurely after the GT-R's cornering speed caused him to pull a muscle in his neck at Fuji Speedway.

In another episode of Top Gear, James May tested the GT-R's launch control. Following his first run using launch control, he stated "that's tremendous, I've never gone off the line that well in a car". Clarkson stated "there's no car that accelerates when you look from 30 yards like this one does". In addition, both presenters stated, "I want it".

In an episode of Fifth Gear, Jason Plato praised the GT-R's acceleration and cornering performance, stating "it's a great car, it's fantastic fun, it's great value for money, we like it, we like it a lot".

Jay Leno, in his television show, praised the GT-R's performance and overall practicality as a sports car by stating "I'm starting to feel that I could get emotionally involved with this car... Let me drop it down a gear and see... Check the pull!... OK, I think I'm emotionally involved. Time to call my wife. Honey, I met something, another car. Not to take your place, just something different."

 Accolades 

In addition of these accolades, the GT-R also have set Guinness World Records for the fastest accelerating four-seater production car, ice speed record for a production car and the fastest drift speed record. In 2010, it was named as having one of the best resale values of any sports car by Yahoo!. Top Gear, Auto Express and Car Connection entitled the GT-R as one of the best performance cars in 2015. Car Connection, again claimed the GT-R as one of the best performance cars in 2019. In 2021 and 2022, Autocar and Auto Express named it as one of the best hardcore sports cars. Road & Track mentioned the GT-R as one of the best daily drivers, while Evo Magazine claimed it as one of the best coupes in 2022. Carwow named the GT-R as one of the best sports cars of 2023.

 Motorsport 

The Nissan GT-R had momentous success in motor racing, as it have accomplished various championship wins, race wins and podium finishes in numerous GT and sports car competitions, notably in the FIA GT1 World Championship, GT World Challenge and also in highly competitive endurance races, such as in the Bathurst 12 Hour, Nürburgring 24 Hours, Spa 24 Hours and more. The GT-R also have given assistance for tuning houses and companies to achieve success in individual motorsports all around the world. In addition, the GT-R was used as safety cars in many major motorsport competitions. Including the Super GT series, FIA GT1 World Championship, British Superbike Championship, Supercars Championship and in many others.

 Super GT 
 GT500 

Nismo, the motorsport arm of Nissan, entered the GT-R Nismo GT500 into the Super GT series in 2008, replacing the 350Z GT. The GT500 version of the car featured a completely different drivetrain compared to the production car. The race car was upgraded to the VK45DE 4.5-litre naturally aspirated V8 engine, instead of the VR38DETT engine. It used a 6-speed sequential manual gearbox and a rear-wheel-drive layout from its predecessor. A prototype was spotted testing around the Suzuka as well as at Fuji in Japan. Beginning of the 2008 season, the car went onto win the opening race at Suzuka, scoring a 1–2 finish for Nissan. In the next race, the GT-R GT500 repeated its 1–2 result, won the drivers' championship by the end of the season, through the Xanavi GT-R Nismo GT500, driven by Satoshi Motoyama and Benoît Tréluyer, although they have only came third in the teams' championship. It also won 7 out of 9 races and 10 podium finishes by 4 different teams using GT-R Nismo GT500 race cars.

Despite having some engine difficulties, the GT-R Nismo GT500 scored 4 victories and 8 podium finishes in the 2009 Super GT series, the reigning champions scored 2 race wins and 3 podium finishes to end up 3rd in the championship standings. In 2010, the VK45DE 4.5-litre engine was replaced by a newly developed VRH34A 3.4-litre engine. The season was not that successful for the car, as it only managed to score 2 race wins and 4 podium finishes. Team Impul ended the season 5th in standings. In 2011 and 2012, Team Mola GT-R Nismo GT500 with drivers Ronnie Quintarelli and Masataka Yanagida got back to back championships in both teams' and drivers' classifications. During those two dominant seasons, the car scored 8 race wins out of 16 races and 19 podium finishes with three different teams. In addition, the car also won the JAF Grand Prix in 2011, as Quintarelli won the first race, starting from pole position, Yanagida finished 2nd to score a podium finish with the fastest lap in the second race. Quintarelli again won the first race in 2012 round, starting from 10th on the grid, while team Impul GT-R Nismo GT500 set the fastest lap. In 2013 Super GT series, the car only managed to score a race win and 4 podium finishes, Team Nismo ended the season 6th in standings. In the last ever JAF Grand Prix, team Impul GT-R Nismo GT500 managed to score a podium finish in the second race, as it finished the race in 3rd position, starting from 7th on the grid.

In 2014, the Super GT regulations were aligned with those of the Deutsche Tourenwagen Masters, and so the V8 engine was replaced with NR20A 2.0-litre, 4-cylinder turbocharged engine. The GT-R Nismo GT500 took out most of the new regulation changes, as it repeatedly won both 2014 and 2015 championships with Team Nismo drivers, Quintarelli and Tsugio Matsuda. The car managed to score 7 race wins and 21 podium finishes during both seasons. In 2016, reigning champions ended up 3rd in standings, while the car scored 5 race wins, 2 pole positions and 7 podium finishes with four different teams. Despite scoring a race win, pole position and 3 podium finishes, both Nismo drivers missed out the championship by just 2 points in 2017. Combined with other teams, the car ended the season with a race win, 2 pole positions and 4 podium finishes.

The 2018 season was the beginning of an unsuccessful era for the GT-R Nismo GT500, as it only managed to score a race win, pole position and 2 podium finishes. By the end of the season, Team Nismo was 8th in championship standings. The 2019 season was also been similar to 2018, as the car only managed to score a race win, 3 pole positions, 2 fastest laps and 6 podium finishes. Team Nismo ended the season 3rd in standings, 32.5 points behind the championship winner. In 2020, Team Nismo fell back to 5th in standings, as the car only scored 2 race wins, a fastest lap and 3 podium finishes. After scoring 2 race wins and 6 podium finishes, it was announced that the GT-R Nismo GT500 will be retired by the end of 2021 season, due to the regulation changes that made the car uncompetitive since the 2018 season. However, along with its 5 drivers' and 4 teams' championships, the GT-R Nismo GT500 has the most race wins for a GT500 car in the Super GT history, with 41 race wins (including 2 Suzuka 10 Hours wins) and scored 89 podium finishes from 113 race starts, making it one of the most successful GT500 race cars of all time. The GT-R Nismo GT500 was replaced with the new Nissan Z GT500 for the 2022 season after the model's 15-year absence.

 GT300 
The GT-R Nismo GT3 made its Super GT debut in 2012 at Okayama, with drivers Katsumasa Chiyo and Yuhi Sekiguchi. The car scored its first race win in the fourth round at Sportsland Sugo, and scored another podium finish in the following round at Suzuka Circuit. By the end of the season, the car was 5th in final standings. Two difficult seasons were followed, as in 2013 the car failed to score a single podium finish and in 2014, it only managed to score a race win. But in the 2013 JAF Grand Prix, NDDP Racing GT-R Nismo GT3, driven by Daiki Sasaki won the first race, starting from pole position. In the second race, the car only managed to finish in 7th position, ended up being the runner-up of the 2013 JAF Grand Prix. The car also managed to set both races' fastest laps, as Nismo Athlete Global Team and NDDP Racing set the fastest laps of the first and second races respectively. The car bounced back in the 2015 Super GT series, as Gainer No.10 GT-R Nismo GT3, driven by André Couto won the championship by scoring 2 race wins and 4 podium finishes. Combined with NDDP Racing No.3 car, the GT-R Nismo GT3 ended the season with a total of 4 race wins and 7 podium finishes.

In 2016, the reigning champion only managed to score a podium finish at the Suzuka 10 Hour round. NDDP Racing ended the season 4th in standings and managed to score a race win and 2 podium finishes that year. In 2017, neither teams were able to score a podium finish. In 2018, Gainer returned with two upgraded GT-R Nismo GT3 race cars, No.10 car ended the season 5th in standings with a race win and two podium finishes, while the other car only managed to score a podium finish. In 2019, Gainer No.11 car scored 2 race wins to finish 4th in standings. No.10 car also scored a race win, while Kondo Racing scored a pole position and a podium finish. Kondo Racing with the GT-R Nismo GT3 Evo won the championship in 2020, with drivers Kiyoto Fujinami and João Paulo de Oliveira, scored 2 race wins and 3 podium finishes. No.11 car achieved a race win and 2 podium finishes, while Tomei Sports managed to score a pole position and a podium finish. Reigning champions returned to defend their title in 2021, but was unsuccessful as they finished the season 2nd in standings, with a race win and 3 podium finishes. No.11 car managed to score a fastest lap, podium finish and two pole positions.

Fujinami and Oliveira managed to win the championship again in 2022, scored a race win and two podium finishes. It was the 3rd Super GT GT300 championship win for the car. Gainer No.10 car also scored a race win, pole position and 3 podium finishes, while the No.11 car only scored 2 podium finishes. For the first time ever, a third different team, called Busou Drago Corse also managed to score a podium finish at the Fuji GT 450 km race. Kondo Racing championship winning car, both NILZZ Racing and Tomei Sports cars, along with both Gainer cars are set to return for the 2023 season. Fujinami is set to be replaced by Teppei Natori.

 FIA GT1 World Championship 

On February 27, 2009, Nismo announced a partnership with British racing team Gigawave Motorsports in order to enter the GT-R into 2009 FIA GT Championship. Their ambition was to fine tune the performance of the car, as they would be able to provide customer cars for future customer teams in the upcoming seasons. Nismo driver Michael Krumm and Gigawave driver Darren Turner were recruited by the team, former Formula One driver, Anthony Davidson also joined the team for the 24 Hours of Spa race, where the car scored an in class podium finish as it finished the race in 3rd position, starting from 8th on the grid. The entry was not eligible for championship points, as it was concerned as a factory team.

In 2010, team Sumo Power GT entered two cars with drivers, Krumm, Peter Dumbreck, Jamie Campbell-Walter and Warren Hughes. Swiss Racing Team also entered the championship with two cars and drivers, former Formula One driver Karl Wendlinger, Henri Moser, Max Nilsson and Seiji Ara. The GT-R GT1 made its official FIA GT1 World Championship debut in the first race of the season at Abu Dhabi. In the following round, the car scored its first race win, as Sumo Power GT No.22 car driven by Walter and Hughes maintained its qualifying position during the qualifying race, and went onto win the championship race by just over two seconds. In the following Brno round, No.23 car finished both races in 3rd position to score two podium finishes during the race weekend. Sumo Power GT continued its podium streak into the next round, as No.22 car finished 3rd in the qualifying race, starting from 5th on the grid and No.23 car finished 2nd in the championship race. The car's next major achievement was followed during the seventh round of the season, as No.23 car driven Krumm and Dumbreck won the qualifying race. In the next round at Navarra, No.22 car scored a podium finish, as it finished 3rd in the championship race, starting from 5th on the grid. The car scored its last podium finish of the season at Interlagos, as No.23 car finished the qualifying race in 2nd position, starting from 6th on the grid. End of the season, No.23 car was 9th in driver's championship and Sumo Power GT was 6th in the team's championship. Swiss Racing Team was unsuccessful, as they finished the season 10th in the team's championship, after barely managing to score points during the second, third and sixth rounds of the season. The GT-R GT1 ended the season with 2 wins and 8 podium finishes.

The 2011 season saw Swiss Racing Team switching to Lamborghini Murciélago LP670 R-SVs, which left Sumo Power GT running four GT-R GT1 race cars, two under the team Sumo Power GT with drivers, Walter, Hughes, Enrique Bernoldi, Ricardo Zonta, Nick Catsburg and former Formula One driver David Brabham, and two under team JR Motorsports with drivers, Krumm, Dumbreck, Richard Westbrook and Lucas Luhr. In the opening round, JR Motorsports scored a double-podium finish in the qualifying race, as No.22 and No.23 cars finished the race 2nd and 3rd respectively. No.22 car maintained 2nd position to score another podium finish in the championship race. The car dominated the whole third round of the season, starting form an all GT-R GT1 1–2 grid for the qualifying race, as Dumbreck and Westbrook took pole position ahead of other three GT-R GT1 race cars, which were on 2nd, 3rd and 4th places on the grid. In the qualifying race, it was a 1–2–3 finish for the car and a 1–2 finish for JR Motorsports. Pole sitters won the race. The momentum continued into the championship race, as No.23 car driven by Krumm and Luhr won the race, while Sumo Power GT No.21 car finished 3rd to score another podium finish.

In the fifth round at Silverstone, it was a double-podium race weekend for the No.23 car, as it finished 2nd in the qualifying race and won the championship race after an intense battle between the team Young Driver AMR Aston Martin DBR9. In the following round, No.21 car finished 3rd in the championship race to score another podium finish. During the seventh round of the season, again JR Motorsports dominated the whole weekend. Qualified 1st and 2nd, No.23 car won both qualifying and championship races. In the following round at Ordos, No.22 car finished 2nd in both races to score two podium finishes, while No.21 car also scored a podium finish, as it was able to finish the qualifying race in 3rd position. In the ninth round of the season, No.23 car finished 3rd in the championship race to score another podium finish, starting from 4th on the grid. Heading onto the final round at San Luis, No.23 car was just a point behind the driver's championship leaders. The car took pole position and finished 2nd to score podium finish in the qualifying race, and also to win the driver's championship for Krumm and Luhr by over 17 points. In the championship race, despite involving in a collision during the opening lap, No.23 car was forced to retire and was unable to score points during the race. No.22 car served a drive-through penalty while leading the race and finished in 8th position, missing out the team's championship win by just 3 points. JR Motorsports were 2nd in the teams' championship, while Sumo Power GT were 5th. The GT-R GT1 ended season with 5 race wins, 3 pole positions and 18 podium finishes. It was the last season for the car in the FIA GT1 World Championship, as in 2012 the GT1 cars were replaced with GT3 cars and Nissan did not enter to defend their title.

 FIA GT3 

While competing in 2011 GT1 World Championship, Nissan and JR Motorsports were jointly been in development with the GT-R Nismo GT3. After numerous testing sessions and three competitive race outings, the car was proved to be competitive enough for customer racing teams. The car was officially introduced in a press release in January 2012, it was claimed to be fully conformed with FIA GT3 regulations. Fitted with an adjustable suspension setup and driver controls, the chassis was also re-tuned for competitive racing. Sales and service were provided by Nissan in Japan, Asia and North America, by JR Motorsports in Europe, Russia and Middle East. Nissan was the first Japanese automobile manufacturer to sell a Group GT3 race car, as the GT-R Nismo GT3 was sold for several customer racing teams throughout the years. Nismo offered several update kits starting from 2013.

 2013 update

The car was offered with performance upgrades for the year 2013. Gear ratios were also been changed in order to optimize the power out put increase. Front canards installation and re-positioned rear wing aid to increase overall downforce. Additionally, the suspension setup and brake balance was re-tuned. In 2014, the car received some minor upgrades like, reducing the running cost and improving reliability. In 2015, fuel efficiency was improved, along with better weight distribution and refined aerodynamics.

 2016 update

After the 2013 update, the car was offered with another major update in 2016. Nismo claimed this updated GT-R Nismo GT3 is faster, lighter and fuel efficient than the previous models. The car was fitted with a new brake system, which had AP Racing's larger brake rotors, calipers and master cylinders in order to provide more stopping power. Weight distribution was improved by moving the starter motor to the rear transaxel, lowered air jacks, revised steering column and driver seating position, refined chassis brackets, revised wiring harness and carbon-fiber air intake pipes were also introduced to aid in weight distribution. The car was also proved to aero efficient than before, as Nismo engineers made the front dive planes, rear diffuser, front and rear bumpers more effective with the help of wind tunnel and trackside testings. Driver safety was also been concerned, as the car was offered with a lowered dashboard and a flat-bottom steering wheel in order improve visibility. Additional side roll cage tubes were added to improve side protection.

 2018 update

In 2018, the GT-R Nismo GT3 was upgraded again, with an aim of lowering the center of gravity and improving weight distribution, significant changes were made over the previous specification. The engine was moved backwards and lowered by  thanks to a thin oil pan, entire drivetrain and driver seating position was also lowered to the ground in order to lower center of gravity and improve weight distribution. The aerodynamic package was improved, as the air flow inside the engine compartment was optimized, refined the layout of air inlets, outlets, radiator and intercooler in order to produce more downforce and improve cooling. Driver comfort was improved by redesigning the steering wheel and center console switch panel, an optional air conditioning system was also offered. The rear suspension setup was changed to a double-wishbone setup. The car received minor upgrades in 2020, which include; repositioned cockpit switches, introduction of Power Distribution Module (PDM), upgraded ABS and TCS systems. The upgraded version was renamed as the GT-R Nismo GT3 Evo.

 Departing from racing
By the end of 2017, Nismo officially departed from competing in international GT championships as a manufacturer, in interest of entering Formula E, but resumed providing technical support for customer racing teams, which were in racing with customer-spec GT-R Nismo GT3 race cars. End of 2019, Nissan did not renew their relationship with their customer team KCMG, with whom they were been competing in international GT championships, meaning that the GT-R Nismo GT3 would no longer race outside of Japan. The car have competed in almost every Group GT3 competitions. As of 2023, the GT-R Nismo GT3 only competes in the Super GT GT300 class, Japan Cup Series and Super Taikyu Series, and FIA homologated for use until the end of 2028.

 GT World Challenge Europe Endurance Cup 

The GT-R Nismo GT3 have competed in the largest GT championship of the world, the GT World Challenge Europe Endurance Cup (previously known as the Blancpain Endurance Series and Blancpain GT Series Endurance Cup). The GT-R Nismo GT3 achieved significant success and fame in this tremendously competitive GT championship. Despite making its debut in the 4th round of 2011 season at Magny-Cours, the car was not in the championship contention, as it have only competed in 4th and 5th rounds of the season. But the car was successful in competition, driven by Westbrook and Brabham, the GT-R Nismo GT3 scored an impressive Pro class 6th-place finish and the fastest lap of its debut race. 2012 season was also been similar to 2011, as the car only have competed in 1–4 rounds of the season.

In 2013, the GT-R Nismo GT3 was proved to be successful again, as Nissan GT Academy Team RJN No.35 car qualified 4th on the grid and led the first race of the season at Monza. Despite losing time during the pit stops, it fell back couple of positions, but managed to finish the race 6th in Pro-Am class. In the second round at Silverstone, the GT-R Nismo GT3 scored its first GT World Challenge Europe Endurance Cup pole position and race win. The car was driven by Lucas Ordóñez, Peter Pyzera and Alex Buncombe, it managed to claim overall pole position and the race win in Pro-Am class, and was able to score a double-podium finish in the following round at Paul Ricard, as JR Motorsports No.23 car finished the race 3rd in Pro class, while Nissan GT Academy Team RJN No.32 car finished the race 2nd in Pro-Am class, resulting in leading the Pro-Am championship. The fourth round of the season, the 24 Hours of Spa, saw the championship leading GT-R Nismo GT3 scoring another podium finish, as the car finished the race in 3rd position. In the final round at Nürburgring, Nissan GT Academy Team RJN won the Pro-Am team's championship. Ordóñez won the Pro-Am driver's championship, Pyzera and Buncombe finished 3rd and 4th in the final standings respectively. The GT-R Nismo GT3 ended the season with a race win, pole position and 4 podium finishes.

The team returned for the 2014 season in order to defend their title, while no GT-R Nismo GT3s were entered for Pro class. In the second round at Silverstone, the car No.80 qualified in 3rd position, driven by Buncombe, Nick McMillen and Florian Strauss, they managed to win the race in Pro-Am class after an intense between an Aston Martin Vantage GT3. In the third round at Paul Ricard, the car took Pro-Am pole position, but the lap time was deleted, as it was revealed that the car crossed the finish line under red flags, and got penalized to start from the 32nd position, the car climbed up positions to finish the race 12th in Pro-AM class. However No.35 car found itself on the podium, as it finished the race 3rd in Pro-Am class, despite starting 4th on the grid. In the final round at Nürburgring, car No.80 took Pro-Am pole position and led the race in the early stages of the race, despite having a gearbox issue the car was forced to pit and lost several positions. The car managed finish the race in 14th position, but missed out the possible team's championship win. The GT-R Nismo GT3 ended the season 4th in the team's championship, tied in points with team AF Corse and 7th in driver's championship, with a race win, pole position and 2 podium finishes.

For the 2015 season, the GT-R Nismo GT3 was entered for both Pro and Pro-Am classes. In the second round at Silverstone, Nissan GT Academy Team RJN No.23 car, took overall pole position, but finished the race in 13th position, despite making contact with a back marker car while leading the race. No.22 car scored a podium finish, as it managed to finish the race 2nd in Pro-Am class. In the third round at Paul Ricard, the No.23 car, Buncombe, Chiyo and Wolfgang Reip, qualified in 2nd position, and won the overall race. In the final round at Nürburgring, the car qualified in 2nd position and finished the race in 3rd position to score another podium finish, which made enough points to win the driver's championship for Buncombe, Chiyo and Reip. Nissan GT Academy Team RJN finished 3rd in the team's championship. Car No.22 achieved pole position in Pro-Am class, but retired from the race due to an incident. The GT-R Nismo GT3 ended the season with a race win, 2 pole positions and 3 podium finishes.

In the 2016 season, reigning champions failed to defend their championship, starting with a strong 4th-place finish at Monza, the car involved in unfortunate incidents at Silverstone, Paul Ricard and 24 Hours of Spa races. In the third round at Paul Ricard, after making contact with another car, the car spun around and dropped back to 31st position, but charged itself to finish the race in 5th position. The GT-R Nismo GT3 ended the season 7th in the team's championship and 9th in the driver's championship with a podium finish at the Nürburgring, starting from 11th on the grid.

In the 2017 season, GT Academy did not enter for the championship, as Motul joined the team instead, No major achievements were followed during the season, as the car only managed to score points at Paul Ricard by finishing 5th. In the final round at Barcelona, the car made an impressive comeback, as it finished the race 13th, starting from 46th position. The GT-R Nismo GT3 finished the season again at 7th in the team's championship.

Nissan did not enter the 2018 season, GT Sport entered instead. The car scored a podium finish in Silver Cup class at Silverstone, starting from 7th on the grid, made some impressive overtakes to finish on the podium. The GT-R Nismo GT3 consistently finished on points for rest of the championship and ended the season 6th in the Silver Cup driver's championship and 12th in the overall team's championship standings. 2019 was the last season that a GT-R Nismo GT3 was entered for the championship, GT Sport Motul Team RJN was replaced by the team KCMG, they wasn't in championship contention that year, as the car was entered only for the 24 Hours of Spa race, where it finished 16th in Pro class.

 GT World Challenge Europe Sprint Cup 
In 2013, the GT1 Championship was replaced by the GT World Challenge Europe Sprint Cup (previously known as the FIA GT Series and GT Sprint Series/Cup), Nissan GT Academy Team RJN entered the championship with the GT-R Nismo GT3. In the inaugural 2013 season, the car entered for Pro-Am class, scored in class podium finishes in every race it was competed. The car did not enter the final round at Baku World Challenge, as it had to enter for the 2013 Dubai 24 Hour race, missing out a possible team's championship win. The GT-R Nismo GT3 ended the season 2nd in the team's championship and 5th in the driver's championship with 2 wins, 2 pole positions and 10 podium finishes.

The GT-R Nismo GT3 did not enter for the championship in 2014, but was entered in 2015, only for the fourth round at Moscow, Nissan GT Academy Team RJN scored a podium finish, as it finished the race 2nd in Pro-Am class. A customer racing team, called MRS GT-Racing/Always Involving Motorsport GT-R Nismo GT3 finished the season 7th in the team's championship and 14th in the driver's championship with a podium finish in the second round of the season at Brands Hatch.
In the 2016 season, Nissan GT Academy Team RJN entered for both Pro and Silver classes. The car ended the season 4th in the Silver class driver's championship with 2 podium finishes at Brand Hatch and Hungaroring. It was the last appearance for a GT-R Nismo GT3 in this championship, as the car was never entered by any team after the 2016 season.

 GT World Challenge Asia 
The GT-R Nismo GT3 only have competed in the 2018 GT World Challenge Asia (previously known as Blancpain GT World Challenge Asia). KCMG entered the season under the Pro-Am and Silver Cup classes. In the opening round at Sepang, No.18 car showed strong pace, as it qualified in 3rd position after topping the timing charts during free parctice. In the first race, despite having to evoid collision with another car, the car spun around and finished in 6th position. In the second race it managed to finish in 4th position. Car No.23 under the Silver Cup class, finished 4th in both races. In the following round at Buriram, No.23 finished 2nd in class during the second race, despite serving a drive-through penalty, it also set the fastest lap of the race. No.18 car scored a double-podium finish during the race weekend, as it managed to finish both races 2nd in class. In the third round at Suzuka, No.23 car finished 2nd in class, 3rd overall in the second race to score another podium finish, while No.18 car scored its first in class race win in the first race of the weekend. The car dominated the next round at Fuji, as No.23 car achieved in class pole position and finished 2nd in both races, while No.18 car won the first race overall, starting from pole position and finished 3rd in class in the second race. It also scored fastest laps in both races. In the following round at Shanghai, No.23 car finished 3rd in class during the first race, No.18 car finished 3rd in class in the second race and also in the second race of the final round at Ningbo. The GT-R Nismo GT3 ended the season 2nd in the Pro-Am driver's championship, with 2 race wins, pole positions, fastest laps and 7 podium finishes, and 5th in the Silver Cup driver's championship with a pole position, fastest lap and 5 podium finishes. The car also finished 4th in the overall team's championship.

RunUp Sports announced that they would enter a GT-R Nismo GT3 Evo for the 2023 Japan Cup Series, which include the Japanese rounds of the 2023 GT World Challenge Asia, the car would compete under the Am Cup class.

 GT World Challenge America 
In 2015, Nissan officially entered for the GT World Challenge America (previously known as the Pirelli World Challenge) as team AE Replay XD Nissan GT Academy. In the fourth round at Birmingham, the car scored its first race win, driven by James Davison, it won the first race of the round, starting from pole position. The car showed strong consistency, as it finished on podium places for 7 consecutive races starting from Wisconsin to Utah rounds, including a race win at Road America and a fastest lap at Ohio rounds. Mid-season driver changes saw the car losing the potential of winning the GTA class championship, which made the car ineligible for points despite having scored multiple race wins, pole positions, fastest laps and podium finishes. The GT-R Nismo GT3 was able to end the season 4th in the GT class driver's championship with 3 wins, a pole position, a fastest lap and 10 podium finishes, 5th in the team's championship.

The team returned for the 2016 season, The GT-R Nismo GT3 started the season on a high, as it finished 2nd in the opening race to score a podium finish and also to achieve pole position and the fastest lap of the race. The car achieved that same result at the second race of St. Petersburg and Bowmanville rounds. In the Ohio round, the car scored another podium finish, as it finished the race in 3rd position. In the next round at Utah, it dominated the whole race weekend, as it won both races back-to-back. In the final round at Laguna Seca, the car finished 3rd to score a podium finish. The GT-R Nismo GT3 ended the season 5th in the driver's championship and 4th in the team's championship with 2 wins, a pole position, a fastest lap and 7 podium finishes. The team did not return for the 2017 and beyond seasons. But only for the 2018 season, teams Nissan Motorsports North America and Always Involving Motorsport entered the championship, only for the third round at Streets of Long Beach.

 GT World Challenge Australia 
Despite only having entered for small amount of races in the previous years of GT World Challenge Australia (previously known as Australian GT Championship), Hobson Motorsport driver Brett Hobson entered for the 2021 GT World Challenge Australia, in order to fight for the championship. The entered GT-R Nismo GT3 was previously used by Nissan for the 2016 Bathurst 12 Hour race, and it entered the competition under GT Trophy class. In the opening race of the first round at Phillip Island, the car scored a podium finish, as it finished the race 3rd in class and 7th in overall positions. In the second race, the car scored its first in class race win, finished 4th in overall positions. In the second round at Mount Panorama, the car finished on the podium, as it finished the race 3rd and 8th in overall positions, starting from pole position in GT Trophy class. The car did not start the second race. In the following round at Tailem Bend, the car qualified 3rd and 6th in class and overall positions respectively. In the race, the car made enough positions to win the overall race with the fastest lap of the race. In the second race, the car retired after racing for 5 laps, due to a gearbox issue. The car was refreshed entirely and returned to the championship deciding final round at Mount Panorama, it paid enough for the car, as it dominated the whole race weekend with back-to-back wins and pole positions. In the first race, the car took pole position and won in class, 3rd in overall positions. In the second and final race of the season, it took pole position again and won in class, 2nd in overall positions with the fastest lap of the race. Even though the car failed to start and retired from couple of races, it made an impressive comeback to finish 2nd in final standings, just 8 points behind the championship winning Audi R8 LMS ultra. The GT-R Nismo GT3 ended the season with 4 wins, 3 pole positions and finished every race in the podium to score 6 podium finishes. The team returned for the 2022 season, only for the first round at Phillip Island, where it took pole position under GT Trophy class and finished 2nd and 3rd positions in the first and second races respectively.

 Intercontinental GT Challenge 

Having only participated in Bathurst 12 Hour and Spa 24 Hours races in 2017, 2019 was the first and only season, a GT-R Nismo GT3 was competed in all Intercontinental GT Challenge races. Entered by team KCMG, it was the first full season for the car. It managed to score points in all races except in Spa, where it finished in 12th position, starting from outside of the 20th position on the grid. The car also scored the fastest laps of Bathurst 12 Hour and California 8 Hours races. It was the only GT championship that the car did not manage to score a single podium position. The GT-R Nismo GT3 ended the season 6th in the manufacturer's championship, just a point behind Ferrari.

 British GT Championship 
The GT-R Nismo GT3 made its British GT Championship debut in 2012, entered by RJN Motorsport with drivers Buncombe and Jann Mardenborough. The car scored its first pole position and podium finish in the first round at Nürburgring. In the fourth round at Brands Hatch, the car scored its first race win after starting 10th on the grid. The car scored another podium at Snetterton Circuit, after finishing the race in 3rd position. The GT-R Nismo GT3 ended the season 6th in final standings with a win, pole position and 3 podium finishes. In 2013, JR Motorsport entered the championship instead, only for the first and second rounds of the season. Nissan GT Academy Team RJN entered for the 2014 season,  in the fifth round at Spa, they finished the race in 2nd position to score a podium finish. Since then, 2018 was the first and final season that a GT-R Nismo GT3 was fully entered for a British GT Championship. RJN Motorsport entered the championship under Silver Cup class, Moore won the championship after taking pole positions and wins in every race it was competed on.

 Super Taikyu Series 

The GT-R Nismo GT3 have proved to be the most successful GT3 car in the Super Taikyu Series (also known as the Super Endurance Series), as it have won the championship for 6 times out of the 12 times it was held. The GT-R Nismo GT3 made its Super Taikyu Series debut in the second round of the 2012 season at Motegi, entered by team Threebond Nissan Technical College for testing, it qualified in 3rd position, and returned to the pits after completed 5 laps in the race, driven by Tomonobu Fujii and Gamisan. The car scored its first Super Taikyu Series race win in the fourth round at Okayama, driven by Fuji, Gamisan and Chiyo, it crossed the finish line by over 21 seconds ahead of the 2nd-placed BMW Z4 GT3. In the fifth round at Suzuka, the car was able to score 2 podium finishes in both races, as it finished in 2nd and 3rd positions in the first and second races respectively. In the final round at Autopolis, the car had to start the race from the back of the grid, despite some technical issues. In the race, it climbed up positions to score another podium by finishing 3rd. Even though it was not in championship contention, the GT-R Nismo GT3 ended the season with a race win and 5 podium finishes.

The team returned for the 2013 season in collaboration with Kondo Racing, additionally GT-R Nismo GT3 race cars were entered by team GTNET Advan and Mach GoGoGo Syaken. In the opening round at Sugo, GTNET Advan No.81 car secured pole position, while Threebond Nissan Technical College No.24 car qualified in 2nd position with a new track record. The race was suspended, due to bad whether conditions. In the second round at Inje Speedium, the No.81 car scored a podium finish in the second race, as it finished the race in 2nd position. Another podium finish was followed in the third round at Motegi, as the car finished the race in 3rd position. The No.24 car again took pole position with a new track record, but finished the race 7th with the fastest lap of the race, despite it had to start from the pit lane, due to technical issues. In the fourth round at Fuji, No.81 car took pole position, ahead of the 2nd-placed No.24 car. Both cars finished the race 3rd and 4th respectively, with the fastest lap of the race. In the Okayama race, No.81 car secured pole position again, despite receiving a 30-second time penalty, as it left the pits in red light conditions, it finished the race in 8th position. The No.24 car scored a podium finish, by finishing the race in 2nd position, just 1.5 seconds behind the race winning car. In the sixth round at Suzuka, No.24 car took pole position, finished 2nd, scoring another podium finish in the first race of the weekend. The No.81 car had a successful weekend, as it managed to finish the first race in 3rd position, second race in 2nd position after taking the pole position and the third race in 3rd position. The GT-R Nismo GT3 scored a total of 4 podium finishes during that weekend. In the final round at Autopolis, the GT-R Nismo GT3 scored a 1–2 finish, as the Mach GoGoGo Syaken No.555 car, driven by Tetsuji Tamanaka and Naoya Yamano won the race and No.81 car finished in 2nd position. The GT-R Nismo GT3 ended the season 3rd in final standings with a race win, 7 pole positions and 10 podium finishes.

Starting from the 2014 season, the GT-R Nismo GT3 dominated the Super Taikyu Series for 3 consecutive years until 2017. In 2014, teams Threebond Nissan Technical College in collaboration with Kondo Racing and GTNET Advan returned to compete in the championship. Team Threebond Nissan Technical College No.24 car, driven by Fujii, Gamisan and Sasaki, started the season on a high, as it won the opening round at Motegi, starting from pole position. GTNET Advan car No.81, driven by Hoshino, Takayuki Aoki and Naofumi Omoto, did not enter for the first round, but still managed to win the second round at Sugo, starting from pole position. The car took pole position again in the third round at Fuji, scored a podium finish by finishing the race in 2nd position. The car took its third consecutive pole position of the season in the fourth round at Okayama, and scored its second win of the season, while No.24 car scored a podium finish, as it finished the race in 3rd position. In the fifth round at Suzuka, the GT-R Nismo GT3 scored a 1–2 finish, as the No.81 car scored its third race win of the season, starting from pole position, and No.24 crossed the finish line in 2nd position. In the final round at Autopolis, the car continued in winning the race, it was the fourth win of the season for the No.81 car, starting from its fifth consecutive pole position, meaning that the car started every race it competed on from the front of the grid. These impressive performance from the No.81 car led Hoshino, Aoki and Omoto to win the 2014 Super Taikyu Series championship. The GT-R Nismo GT3 ended the season with 5 race wins, 6 pole positions and 8 podium finishes.

Both teams returned for the 2015 season, additionally, Endless Sports and Team Mach also entered with GT-R Nismo GT3 race cars. In the opening round at Motegi, it was a 1–2 finish for the GT-R Nismo GT3, as team Endless Sports No.3 car won the race and Kondo Racing No.24 car finished the race in 2nd position. In the following round at Sugo, No.3 car took pole position, but retired form the race due to an incident. In the third round at Fuji, saw the GT-R Nismo GT3 scoring a 1–2–3 finish, as No.3 car won its second race of the season, No.24 car finished the race in 2nd position and Team Mach No.5 car finished 3rd to score its first podium finish of the season. In the following round at Autopolis, championship defending GTNET No.1 car took pole position, despite having a technical issue, it was forced to retire from the race. No.3 car scored its third win of the season, while No.24 car finished in 3rd position to score another podium finish. The GT-R Nismo GT3 scored another 1–2 finish in the following round at Okayama, as No.24 car took pole position, but finished the race in 7th position, despite making contact with another car during the race. No.5 car won its first race of the season, while No.3 car finished in 2nd position to score another podium. In the final round of the season, championship defending No.1 car scored its only win of the season, No.3 car scored a podium finish, as it finished the race in 3rd position, and also to win the 2015 Super Taikyu Series for drivers, Yukinori Taniguchi, Kyosuke Mineo and Yuya Motojima. Combined with all other GT-R Nismo GT3 race cars that entered, the car have ended the season with 5 race wins, 3 pole positions and 11 podium finishes.

2016 season was the most dominant season for the GT-R Nismo GT3, as it won every races of the season, and all three cars entered by the returned teams ended the season at 1st, 2nd and 3rd places in the final standings. The opening round at Motegi, saw a 1–2–3 finish for the GT-R Nismo GT3, as team Kondo Racing No.24 car won the race, GTNET No.5 car finished the race in 2nd position after taking pole position and the defending champions, Endless Sports No.3 car took the 3rd place of the podium. A 1–2 finish was followed for the in the second round at Sugo, as No.24 car took pole position and won the race, while No.3 car finished the race in 2nd position to score another podium finish. In the third round at Suzuka, No.3 car won the race, while No.24 car finished the race in 3rd after scoring its second consecutive pole position. Two consecutive 1–2 finishes were followed, as in the fourth round at Fuji, No.24 car scored its third win of the season, while No.3 car finished the race in 2nd position. In the fifth round at Okayama, No.24 won again after taking its third pole position of the season, while No.3 car finished in 2nd position. In the final round at Autopolis, it was another 1–2–3 finish for the GT-R Nismo GT3, No.3 car won the race, No.24 car took pole position and finished the race in 2nd position and No.5 car took 3rd place in the podium. No.24 GT-R Nismo GT3, driven by Fuji, Yudai Uchida and Kazuki Hiramine won the 2016 Super Taikyu Series. Combined with every GT-R Nismo GT3 race car that entered, the car have ended the season with 6 consecutive race wins, 5 pole positions and 15 podium finishes.

The teams returned for the 2017 season, in the opening round at Motegi, it was a 1–2–3 finish for the GT-R Nismo GT3, as championship defending Kondo Racing No.1 car won the race with the fastest lap of the race, Endless Sports No.3 car finished 2nd and GTNET No.99 car took 3rd place of the podium. Two consecutive 1–2 finishes were followed for the car, in the second round at Motegi, No.24 car won and No.3 car finished in 2nd position again with the fastest lap. In the third round at Suzuka, No.99 car won the race and No.3 car finished the race in 2nd position. In the fifth round at Fuji, No.1 car scored another podium finish, as it finished the race in 3rd position. In the final round at Okayama, No.3 car finished the race in 2nd position, while No.99 car finished in 3rd position to score a double-podium finish. Kondo Racing No.1 car ended up in 2nd position in the championship. The GT-R Nismo GT3 ended the season with 3 race wins and 10 podium finishes.

For the 2018 season, teams returned for the championship. The car began the season with a 1–2 finish in the opening round at Suzuka, GTNET No.99 car won the race, Kondo Racing No.24 finished 2nd with the fastest lap of the race after starting from pole position. In the following round at Sugo, No.24 car scored another podium by finishing the race in 3rd position. In the third round at Fuji, No.3 car took pole position, No.99 car won the race. The car scored another 1–2 finish in fourth round at Autopolis, as No.24 car won the race starting from pole position, No.99 car finished 2nd to score another podium finish. In Motegi, No.24 car took its second consecutive and third pole position of the season, while No.3 car won the race and No.99 car finished in 3rd to score another podium finish. It was another 1–2 finish for the GT-R Nismo GT3 in the final round at Okayama, as No.24 car won the race and No.99 scored its fourth consecutive podium finish of the season. GTNET No.99 car, driven by Hoshino, Teruhiko Hamano and Kiyoto Fujinami won the 2018 Super Taikyu Series, while Kondo Racing No.24 and Endless Sports No.3 car finished 2nd and 3rd in the final standings respectively. The GT-R Nismo GT3 ended the season with 5 wins, 3 pole positions and 10 podium finishes.

For the 2019 season, the reigning champions returned to defend their title, while team Kondo Racing and Endless Sports was replaced with MP Racing and Tairoku Racing. In the opening round at Suzuka, reigning champions' No.1 car took pole position, despite making contact with another car, it finished the race in 6th position with the fastest lap of the race, while MP Racing No.9 car scored a podium finish, as it finished the race in 3rd position. In the following round at Sugo, No.1 car won the race starting from pole position. It was a 1–2–3 finish for the car at Fuji 24 Hour race, as No.1 car won the race, No.9 car finished 2nd and Tairoku Racing No.300 car finished in 3rd position with the fastest lap of the season, starting from pole position. No.1 car scored its third consecutive race win at the fourth round at Autopolis. The No.1 car did not participate in the following round at Motegi, as it was revealed that points they have already scored were enough to win the 2019 Super Taikyu Series. No.9 car scored a podium finish, as it finished the race in 2nd position. No.1 car returned for the final round at Okayama, it finished the race in 3rd position. GT-R Nismo GT3 ended the season with 3 wins, 2 pole positions and 8 podium finishes.

Only two GT-R Nismo GT3 race cars were entered for the 2020 season, as Daishin GTNET and MP Racing were the only teams entered for the season. In the opening round at Fuji, GTNET No.81 car scored a podium finish, as it finished the race in 3rd position. In the following round at Sugo, MP Racing No.9 car finished the race in 3rd position with the fastest lap of the race. 3 consecutive double-podium finishes continued for the GT-R Nismo GT3, as in the third and fourth rounds at Okayama and Motegi respectively, No.81 car finished 2nd and No.9 car finished those races in 3rd position. In the final round at Autopolis, No.9 car finished 2nd, while No.81 car finished the race in 3rd position with the fastest lap. MP Racing was 2nd in final standings. It was the first time that the GT-R Nismo GT3 did not win a race in a Super Taikyu Series since its debut in 2012. The car ended the season with only 8 podium finishes. Both teams returned for the 2021 season with upgraded GT-R Nismo GT3 Evo race cars, but was not in championship contention, as both teams did not enter for every races of the season. In the Fuji 24 Hour race, GTNET No.81 car won the race. In the following fourth round at Autopolis, MP Racing No.9 car finished in 2nd position to score a podium finish. In the final round at Okayama, No.81 scored another podium finish, as it finished the race in 2nd position. Team Daishin GTNET was 4th in final standings. The GT-R Nismo GT3 Evo ended the season with a win and 3 podium finishes.

For the 2022 season, both teams returned, additionally HELM Motorsports also entered with a GT-R Nismo GT3 Evo. In the opening round at Suzuka, GTNET No.81 car won the race. In the following Fuji 24 Hour race, HELM Motorsports No.62 car won the race, while No.81 car finished in 3rd position to score another podium finish. In the fourth round at Autopolis, No.62 car scored its second race win of the season. In the fifth round at Motegi, No.81 car scored another podium finish, as it finished the race in 2nd position. HELM Motorsports GT-R Nismo GT3 Evo head onto the sixth round of the season at 2nd position in the championship standings, just 0.5 points behind the championship leading Mercedes AMG GT3 Evo. In the following round, the car finished the race in 5th position, just behind its championship rival AMG GT3 Evo, which finished the race in 4th position. No.62 car head onto the championship decider 2.5 points behind the AMG GT3 Evo. In the final round, the car finished the race in 2nd position, as the AMG GT3 Evo finished the race in 4th position, the No.62 car won the championship by 7.5 points with drivers, Yutaka Toba, Yuya Hiraki and Reiji Hiraki. The car ended season with 3 wins and 6 podium finishes.

Defending champions HELM Motorsports and GTNET Motorsports returned for the 2023 season. In addition, team 5Zigen also entered to participate in the series with a GT-R Nismo GT3 Evo. In the opening round at Suzuka, 5Zigen No.500 car won the race, starting from pole position. It also set the fastest lap of the race.

 ADAC GT Masters 

The GT-R Nismo GT3 made its ADAC GT Masters full season debut in 2015, with team MRS GT-Racing. Despite it was the car's first season, in most of the races it managed to finish on points. But three race retirements and two race withdrawals saw the car ending the season in 11th position in the team's championship. In 2016, switching to the Junior class in mid-season, resulted in missing out a possible championship win in Trophy class. By the end of the season, The car was 4th in the Trophy class championship standings. In 2017, after scoring multiple class wins and podium finishes, the car won the Trophy class championship for the reigning champion, Remo Lips. It was the last season a GT-R Nismo GT3 was entered for the championship.

 Endurance races 
 Bathurst 12 Hour

The Bathurst 12 Hour was one of the most successful endurance races for the GT-R Nismo GT3, as where its predecessor, Nissan Skyline GT-R R32 Group A also have earned its nickname "Godzilla", despite the standard GT-R made its debut in 2012, entered by team Donut King Racing and driven by Tony Alfred, Adam Breechey and Peter Leemhuis, it won the C class and finished the race 6th in overall positions. The GT-R Nismo GT3 made its Bathurst 12 Hour debut in 2014, entered by Nismo Athlete Global Team, it qualified in 5th position for the race. In the race, while battling for 3rd position, the car involved in an incident and was forced to retire from the race. The team returned for the 2015 race, with drivers Strauss, Chiyo and Reip, the car crashed while on a flying for pole position, but managed to qualify in 3rd position. In the race after an intensive battle up front in the final 20 minutes of the race, the car charged itself from 3rd to 1st on the penultimate lap and won the 2015 Liquid Moly Bathurst 12 Hour. It was the first time won by a Nissan entered car since the 1992 race, as the Skyline GT-R R32 Group N won the race for the last time before it got banned. In the 2016 race, where after qualifying in a disappointing 13th position, Chiyo, Strauss and Nissan Australia's Rick Kelly finished the race in 2nd position, closed the 14 second time deficit to 1.2 seconds behind the race-winning McLaren 650S GT3 from Tekno Autosports, during the closing stages of the race. However the car led the most laps in the race, having led for 107 out of the 297 laps run.

The team did not return for the 2017 race, instead Nissan Motorsport and Wall Racing entered the race each with two GT-R Nismo GT3 race cars. Nissan Motorsport No.24 car led the race in different scenarios, despite having a gearbox issue in the 6th hour of the race, the car was forced to pit and rejoined the race in 10th position, but managed to finish the race 4th in class and 8th overall. No.23 car retired from the race due to technical errors, despite the car competed in the race for 174 laps, it was classified as it finished the race 8th in class and 32nd in overall positions. Both Wall Racing entered cars were retired from the race, but No.38 car was classified as it finished the race in 31st position, despite it competed for 200 laps. The car did not enter for the race in 2018. In 2019 KCMG entered the race with two GT-R Nismo GT3 race cars, as a part of the 2019 Intercontinental GT Challenge. No.18 car finished the race in 7th position, while No.35 car finished 10th in class and 15th in overall positions. The team returned for the 2020 race, where No.18 car qualified in 4th position, while No.35 car withdrew the race due to a crash during the practice session. No.18 car finished the race 9th in class and 12th in overall positions. A GT-R Nismo GT3 entered by Hobson Motorsport, was qualified 6th and 31st, finished the race 5th and 21st in class and overall positions respectively. Since then no GT-R Nismo GT3 race cars were entered for the race.

 Dubai 24 Hour
The GT-R Nismo GT3 also have competed in the Dubai 24 Hour race, making its debut in 2012, the car finished the race in 22nd position in A6 class. The car did not enter for races in 2013 and 2014, but in 2015, car No.23 entered by Nissan GT Academy Team RJN with GT Academy drivers, Strauss, Ricardo Sanchez, Ahmed Bin Khanen, Nick Hammann and Gaetan Paletou, qualified on pole position in Pro-Am class and 14th in overall positions. Even though it received couple of drive through penalties, the car managed to score a podium finish, as it finished the race 2nd in Pro-Am class and 5th in overall positions. In 2016, a customer team, MRS GT-Racing entered a GT-R Nismo GT3 in Pro class, the car finished the race in 11th in Pro class and 23rd in overall positions, starting from 10th on the grid in Pro class. No GT-R Nismo GT3 race cars were entered for the 2017 and 2018 races, but in 2019, KCMG entered the race with two cars, No.35 car qualified 10th and No.23 car qualified 12th in Pro class, No.35 car managed to finish the race 8th in Pro class and 29th in overall positions, but No.23 car retired from the race, as it involved in an incident during the race. Since then no GT-R Nismo GT3 race cars were entered for the race.

 Nürburgring 24 Hours
Following the GT-R Club Track Edition's participation in SP8T class for couple of years, the GT-R Nismo GT3 made its Nürburgring 24 Hours debut in 2013, entered by team Schulze Motorsport, the car qualified 26th overall. During the race, despite having some technical issues, the team had to replace its engine, and the car managed to finish the race in 134th position overall. The team returned for the 2014 race, where they finished 11th in SP9 GT3 class and 14th in overall positions. Nissan GT Academy Team RJN also entered the race with two cars, No.80 car finished the race 13th in SP9 class and 24th in overall positions. No.30 car retired from the race, despite making contact with a barrier during the race. Both teams returned for the 2015 race, but team GT Academy entered the race only with the No.35 car, which qualified in 31st position, missing out the top 30 pole position shootout, despite receiving a penalty. In the race, driven by Ordóñez, Krumm, Buncombe and Hoshino, the car charged itself to finish the race in 9th position. Schulze Motorsport GT-R Nismo GT3 was just behind the No.35 car until the last hour of the race, but the car had a gearbox issue and was forced to retire from the race.

Nissan GT Academy Team RJN returned for the 2016 race, the car qualified in 25th position and climbed up positions to finish the race in 11th position overall. A customer team, Team Zakspeed also entered the race with a GT-R Nismo GT3, but retired from the race due to an incident. The car did not enter for the 2017 and 2018 races. In 2019, Kondo Racing entered the race with a GT-R Nismo GT3, driven by Fuji, Matsuda, Tom Coronel and Mitsunori Takaboshi, it qualified in 25th position overall, and finished the race 8th in SP9 class and 9th in overall positions. KCMG also entered for the race with two GT-R Nismo GT3 race cars, both cars retired from the race, due to incidents and technical errors. It was the last time that a GT-R Nismo GT3 was entered for a Nürburgring 24 Hours race. Apart from the Nürburgring 24 Hours races, the car also have won races and scored podium finishes in the Nürburgring Endurance Series.

 Suzuka 10 Hours
Despite being a round of the Super GT series, both GT-R Nismo GT500 and GT-R Nismo GT3 have raced in the Suzuka 10 Hours (also known as Suzuka 1000 km). The GT-R Nismo GT500 was the most successful, as it has a 100 percent podium finish percentage in this particular endurance race. The car made its debut in 2008, won the race with team Impul Matsuda and Sébastien Philippe. In 2009 and 2010, the car took 2nd place, with the fastest lap in 2010. In 2011, Hasemi Motorsport drivers, Quintarelli and Yanagida took overall pole position, finished the race in 2nd position with the fastest lap, while team Impul car finished 3rd to make it a double-podium for the car. In 2012, Quintarelli and Yanagida dominated the whole race weekend to win the race starting from pole position, as well as to set the fastest lap of the race. Kondo Racing GT-R Nismo GT500 finished 3rd to score the second consecutive double-podium finish for the car. The GT-R Nismo GT3 made its race debut and went onto score a podium finish, as it finished the race 2nd in GT300 class.

In 2013, the GT-R Nismo GT500 finished 2nd after starting from position and took over the championship lead. Another 2nd placed podium finish was followed in 2014. In 2015, Nismo drivers, Quintarelli and Matsuda took pole position and finished 7th, while tam Impul car scored a podium finish by finishing the race in 3rd position. Gainer Tanax GT-R Nismo GT3 with drivers, Couto, Katsumasa and Ryuichiro Tomita won the GT300 class, starting from 2nd on the grid. The car scored another GT300 class podium finish, after finishing the 2016 race in 2nd position. Team Mola GT-R Nismo GT500 finished 3rd to score a podium finish, starting from 2nd on the grid, while team Forum Engineering Advan car set the fastest lap of the race. 2017 was the last Suzuka 10 Hours race for the GT-R Nismo GT500. Kondo Racing car with drivers, Sasaki and Oliveira took pole position, finished the race 5th with the fastest lap. Team Nismo finished 2nd to score a podium finish.

Starting from 2018, Suzuka 10 Hours no longer took part of the Super GT series, instead it took part of the Intercontinental GT Challenge. In 2018, KCMG GT-R Nismo GT3 qualified 4th on the grid, but retired during the race. Team Gainer car qualified 10th and finished the race in 14th position. In 2019, KCMG car qualified in a disappointing 13th position, but made enough positions to finish the race in 6th position overall. MP Racing car scored an 2nd placed Am class podium finish with drivers, Yusaku Shibata, Joe Shindo and Takumi Takata. The race was not held in 2020, 2021 and 2022 due to the COVID-19 pandemic.

Macau Grand Prix
The GT-R Nismo GT3 was entered for the Macau Grand Prix (previously known as the FIA GT World Cup) by KCMG in 2018. The car was entered for the race under both Platinum and Silver classes with drivers, Matsuda and Oliver Jarvis for the Platinum class, while Alexandre Imperatori for the Gold class. The car achieved instant success even though it was its debut year. Imperatori qualified in 3rd position under the Gold class during qualifying and maintained that position in the qualifying race. Matsuda and Jarvis qualified 9th and 10th under Platinum class respectively. In the qualifying race, Jarvis climbed up two positions to finish 8th, while Matsuda was forced to retire from the race despite an engine issue. In the main race Imperatori again maintained 3rd position to score a podium finish, while Jarvis and Matsuda finished 8th and 9th under the Platinum class. The car did not return for the 2019 and beyond races.

 Other categories 
A production-based GT-R made its world motorsport debut in Australia's Targa Tasmania tarmac rally in April 2008, however it sustained damage early in the event and did not complete the rally. Later in 2008 a GT-R won the Competition Modern class in the Targa West before returning to Targa Tasmania in 2009 to take the outright win in the Modern class. In 2009 GT-R won the One Lap of America competition. In 2010 the GT-R finished 2nd over all in the One Lap of America competition. During the 2010 SCCA World Challenge season, a pair of GT class GT-Rs were campaigned by Brass Monkey Racing and driven by Steve Ott and Tony Rivera.

On June 4, 2010, Nismo introduced the GT-R Club Track Edition available via the Nismo supported Omori aftermarket factory. This domestic market trim was a non-street legal, race-ready variant equipped with a 6-point roll cage and upgraded with the Nismo race package developed through its Tokachi endurance racer program. On June 25 and 26, 2011, the No.71 Schulze Motorsport GT-R Club Track Edition took part in the 2011 24 Hours of Nürburgring. Driven by Michael Schulze, Tobias Schulze, Kazunori Yamauchi and Yasuyoshi Yamamoto, the car finished the race in 36th place overall, achieving a victory in the SP8T class after overcoming several technical problems. It was the first time a GT-R (R35) took part in the 24 Hours of Nürburgring. In 2012, Nissan participated the SP8T class with two Club Track Edition GT-R race cars as a works team, entered by Team Nissan and GT Academy, both cars completed a 1–2 finish in its class and 30th and 99th overall, driven by Ordóñez, Yamauchi, Yamamoto, Tobias Schulze and Krumm, Hoshino, Toshio Suzuki, Tetsuya Tanaka respectively.

 Aftermarket Tuning 
 Tuning 
Succeeding the Nissan Skyline GT-R, the GT-R is also well recognized for its tuning capabilities among many enthusiasts, apart from its great performance for price ratio, daily driving practicality and motor racing, its aftermarket tuning potential also caused its current success and recognition. The GT-R have set various speed records and victories in drag racing, time attacks, hill climbing, drifting and more. Despite early concerns about the difficulty of modifying the GT-R, many aftermarket tuning parts have become available throughout the years. The previously reported "untunable" ECU has since been hacked by several tuning houses. COBB Tuning was the first company to access the GT-R's encrypted ECU. Japan based tuner, Mine's also has limited control of the ECU, and others (MCR, HKS, and Top Secret) have bypassed the unit. They have been seen testing modified GT-Rs with the former two having conducted tests at the Tsukuba Circuit.

Ecutek tuning, on the other hand, was the first company to manipulate and change automatic mode shift points in the transmission control module (TCM) of the GT-R. This can be done at will by the driver. Ecutek also allows the driver to adjust launch control on the fly available with a wrap-around boost gauge that can read over 20 psi. COBB Tuning and Ecutek offered engine tuning on the ECU and TCM with different launch control software from LC1 up to LC5. On January 16, 2013, Ecutek also became the first company to construct and offer Flex Fuel hardware and software capability for all GT-R models. This fuel kit requires the Ecutek specific TCM. The kit provides changes in the cold start cranking compensation, changes to the maximum target boost, changes in the ignition timing, changes to target airflow, changes in cam timing, and changes in the fuel economy gauge reading all based solely on ethanol content in the gas tank.

AMS Performance and Extreme Turbo Systems were the major turner companies for building drag cars and aftermarket tuner parts for the GT-R in North America.

In a review by Motor Trend editor Scott Kanemura, it was revealed that the GPS system fitted to the GT-R would remove the  speed limiter when the car arrives at a race track, but only on tracks approved by Nissan. Aftermarket ECUs have been developed to bypass that speed limiter, in addition to stand-alone speed-limiter defeaters. The GPS check will not be implemented in American models. Nismo themselves also have offered many tuning packages for the GT-R, starting with the "Club Sports" tuning package, which contained the upgraded parts of the GT-R SpecV, various tuning packages were became available over the years. Which include; Nürburgring Nordschleife record setting N-Attack Package, Clubman Race Spec (CRS), Sports Resetting and Version Up sets which offered facelifted upgrades for non-facelifted cars.

 Drag Racing 

AMS Performance, based in West Chicago, Illinois, was well known for GT-R's drag racing success, having set record power levels and performance numbers for the GT-R. Their Alpha Omega GT-R as well as the first GT-R to reach the 9, 8, 7 and 6 second quarter mile runs. In June 2013, the Omega broke into the 7 seconds, when it ran a 7.98 at 299.56 km/h (186.14 mph). During the evening of the 7-second pass, the Omega broke a couple of other records. The Omega bested its previous 97–209 km/h (60–130 mph) time with 2.67 seconds. The Omega also broke the 161–241 km/h (100–150 mph) record which was previously held by an Underground Racing TT Gallardo (2.58 seconds) with 2.45 seconds. But in June 2015, the Alpha Omega GT-R was generating over 2050 horsepower and boasted from 0–60 mph in just 1.49 seconds. The Omega set multiple world records at the WannaGoFast 1/2 Mile Shootout at Built Field Airport in Monee, Illinois which included: a trap speed of 361.8 km/h (224.91 mph) in a standing 1/2 mile; from 97 to 209 km/h (60–130 mph) in 2.28 seconds; 0–161 km/h (0–100 mph) in 2.78 seconds; 0–300 km/h (0–186 mph) in 7.07 seconds; 0–322 km/h (0–200 mph) in 10.49 seconds. the Alpha Omega GT-R did its best quarter-mile time in 7.49 seconds at 310 km/h (193 mph). making it the quickest and fastest GT-R and road-legal vehicle in the world, and the car won the King Of The Streets competition two times in a row. The AMS Performance Alpha Omega package functions more as a shop/research and development vehicle which is the reason why it is not available to the general public.

In 2017, AMS Performance built Alpha-G GT-R, which became the first GT-R to run a quarter-mile in 6 seconds. The car completed the run in 6.937 seconds, by Gidi Chamdi with a trap speed of 315.36 km/h (196 mph) and held the fastest all-wheel-drive vehicle record. Later, ETS (Extreme Turbo Systems) GT-R broke the record with a 6.88 seconds of a quarter-mile run at 358.80 km/h (223 mph), also set the record for fastest standing half-mile with a trap speed of 410.29 km/h (255 mph). T1 Race's Nightfury GT-R set the record for fastest stock location turbo GT-R as well as the fastest and quickest GT-R record, as it completed a quarter mile distance in 6.51 seconds with a trap speed of 370 km/h (230 mph).

At the Dragtimes Competition in Russia, the AMS Alpha 12 GT-R broke the fastest road-legal standing 1 mile record, driven by Jury with a trap speed of 382 km/h (237 mph). Later in the same competition, Switzer Goliath GT-R broke the quickest road-legal standing 1 mile record in 22.602 seconds at a trap speed of 402 km/h (250 mph).

 Time Attack 
Modified GT-Rs have competed in several time attack challenges, especially in the World Time Attack Challenge (WTAC). Time attack GT-Rs have been fielded by HKS, Precision Automotive Racing and LYFE. It became the fastest vehicle at Fontana, California, Fuji Speedway (achieving a peak speed of over 322 km/h (200 mph) in the main start/finish straight) and also in Sydney Motorsport Park. The car competed at 2015 WTAC and won the GT-R R35 class with the fastest lap time of 1:30.838 minutes. But in 2017, LYFE's  GT-R broke all HKS's records and won the title for the fastest time attack GT-R in the WTAC. In 2017 WTAC, Precision Automotive Racing's GT-R, driven by Aaron McGranahan, set a peak speed of 269 km/h (167 mph) and won the Flying 500 class title. The team did not return for the 2018 season. In 2019, the car finished 5th in Pro class championship. In 2019, the car also won the Super Lap Battle USA, setting a lap time 2:07.18 minutes around the Circuit of the Americas. The car was also claimed to be the fastest time attack car in North America.

Hill Climb 
The GT-R have competed in both stock and modified forms in many hill climbing competitions, notably in the Jaguar Simola Hill Climb in South Africa. In the 2019 Jaguar Simola Hill Climb, the GT-R was named the most successful supercar, as it won the final Top 10 Shootout event, with Kyle Mitchell driving, setting a time of 40.862 seconds and becoming the fastest road-legal vehicle.

Drifting 
In addition of GT-R Nismo fastest drift world record, Masato Kawabata also have won the 2015 D1 Grand Prix with team Toyo Tires Drift Trust Racing GT-R. Darren Kelly with team The Heart of Racing GT-R won the Pro-series championship of 2019 and 2021 D1NZ Drifting Championships.

Others 
On August 13, 2014, Mike Newman set a Guinness world record for the "Fastest speed for a car driven blindfolded" in a GT-R modified by Litchfield Motors (UK).

References

Further reading

External links 

 Nissan GT-R official global site 

GT-R
GT-R
All-wheel-drive vehicles
Coupés
Grand tourers
2010s cars
2020s cars
Cars introduced in 2007